In Adyghe, like all Northwest Caucasian languages, morphology is the most important part of the grammar. An Adyghe word, besides that it has its own lexical meaning, sometimes, by the set of morphemes it is built of and by their aggregate grammatical meanings, can reproduce a sentence. For example, a verb by its set of morphemes can express subject's and object's person, place, time, manner of action, negative, and other types of grammatical categories. For example: къыпфэсхьыщтэп "I will not bring it for you" consists of these morphemes: къы-п-фэ-с-хьы-щт-эп – which have these literal meanings "from there (къы) you (п) for you (фэ) I (с) bring (хьы) will (attribute of the future tense – щт) not (эп)".

Verbal Prefixes
In Adyghe there are two kind of prefixes : Directional prefixes and informative prefixes. Directional prefixes express the direction of the verb while informative prefixes add additional information related to the verb like the location, the reason and the participants.

Directional prefixes
Directional prefixes express the movement of the object and the direction of the verb.

Positional prefixes

Cislocative (къэ~)

Towards (лъ~)
The verbal suffix ~лъ (~ɬ) designates action directed towards someone or something. for example:

 макӏо /maːkʷʼa/ (s)he is going → лъэкӏо /ɬakʷʼa/ (s)he is going after; (s)he is following.
 мачъэ /maːt͡ʂa/ (s)he is running → лъэчъэ /ɬat͡ʂa/ (s)he is running after.
 мэкуо /makʷəwa/ (s)he is shouting → лъэкуо /ɬakʷəwa/ (s)he is shouting toward.
 маплъэ /mapɬə/ (s)he is looking → лъэплъэ /ɬapɬa/ (s)he is looking after.
 ео /jawa/ (s)he is hitting → лъэо /ɬawa/ (s)he is hitting toward.
 едзы /jad͡zə/ (s)he is throwing → лъедзы /ɬajd͡zə/ (s)he is throwing toward.
 ехьэ /jaħa/ (s)he is entering → лъехьэ /ɬajħa/ (s)he is entering after.
 мэӏабэ /maʔaːba/ (s)he is trying to reach → лъыӏэбэн /ɬəʔaban/ (s)he is trying to reach toward.

{|
|-
|шъо || кӏалэхэмкӏэ || шъукъэслъыкӏу
|-
|шъо || кӏалэхэ-мкӏэ || шъу-къэ-с-лъы-кӏу
|-
| ||  || 
|-
|you (plural)|| from the boys (ins.)|| follow me (said to plural).
|-
|colspan=3|"You boys follow me (said to plural)."
|}

{|
|-
|кӏалэр || мыжъокӏэ || къэслъэгъуе
|-
| ||  || 
|-
|the boy (abs.)|| using a rock (ins.) || (s)he is throwing at me
|-
|colspan=3|"The boy is throwing at me rocks."
|}

Backwards (зэкӏ~)
To indicate a verb that was done backwards, the prefix зэкӏ- (zat͡ʃʼ-) is added. It indicates that the verb was done toward behind the subject, for example:

 макӏо /maːkʷʼa/ (s)he is going → зэкӏакӏо /zat͡ʃʼaːkʷʼa/ (s)he is going backwards.
 мачъэ /maːt͡ʂa/ (s)he is running → зэкӏачъэ /zat͡ʃʼaːt͡ʂa/ (s)he is running backwards.
 маплъэ /mapɬə/ (s)he is looking → зэкӏаплъэ /zat͡ʃʼaːɬapɬa/ (s)he is looking backwards.
 едзы /jad͡zə/ (s)he is throwing → зэкӏедзы /zat͡ʃʼajd͡zə/ (s)he is throwing backwards.
 мэӏабэ /maʔaːba/ (s)he is trying to reach → зэкӏэӏабэ /zat͡ʃʼaʔaːba/ (s)he is trying to reach out backwards.

{|
|-
| зэкӏаплъи || плъэгъущт || кӏалэр
|-
| зэкӏа-плъ-и || п-лъэгъу-щт || кӏалэ-р
|-
| ||  || 
|-
| look backwards in order to|| you will see || the boy (abs.)
|-
|colspan=3|"Look behind and you will see the boy."
|}

{|
|-
|нахьыеу || тӏэкӏу || зэкӏакӏу
|-
|нахьы-еу || тӏэкӏу || зэкӏа-кӏу
|-
| ||  || 
|-
| more || a bit || move backward
|-
|colspan=3|"Move backward a bit more."
|}

Bypass (блэ~)
The verbal prefix блэ~ /bɮa~/ designates action bypass someone or something for example:
 блэкӏын /bɮat͡ʃʼən/ to go pass something or someone.
 блэшъутын /bɮəʃʷtən/ to run pass something or someone.
 блихын /bɮəjxən/ to barely miss something or someone.
 дзын /d͡zən/ to throw → блэдзын /bɮad͡zən/ to throw bypass.
 плъэн /pɬən/ to look → блэплъын /bɮapɬən/ to look bypass.
 пкӏэн /pt͡ʃʼan/ to jump → блэпкӏын /bɮapt͡ʃʼən/ to jump bypass.
 быбын /bəbən/ to fly → блэбыбын /bɮabəbən/ to fly bypass.
 он /wan/ to hit; to shoot → блэун /bɮawən/ to miss.

{|
|-
|гъогум || сэ || сыблэкӏы
|-
|гъогу-м || сэ || сы-блэкӏы
|-
| ||  || 
|-
| road (erg.)|| I || I go bypass
|-
|colspan=3|"I go pass the road."
|}

{|
|-
| сыкъашти || цӏыфыхэмэ || саблэгъэплъ
|-
| сы-къашт-и || цӏыфы-хэ-мэ || с-а-блэ-гъэ-плъ
|-
| ||  || 
|-
| hold me up and || people (abs.) || let my look bypass them
|-
|colspan=3|"Hold me up and let me look bypass the people."
|}

{|
|-
|псыхъом || къэздачъи || блэпкӏ
|-
|псыхъо-м || къэздачъ-и || блэпкӏ
|-
| ||  || 
|-
| river (erg.) || to run from a distance || jump bypass
|-
|colspan=3|"Start running from a distance and jump over the river."
|}

Pass through (пхы~)
The verbal prefix пхы~ (пхыры~) (pxə~) designates action, motion directed through some obstacle, object; for example:

 пхырыкӏын /pxərət͡ʃʼən/ to pass through.
 плъэн /pɬən/ to look → пхырыплъын /pxərəpɬən/ to look pass through something

{|
|-
| кӏалэр || мэзым || пхырыкӏыгъ
|-
| кӏалэ-р || мэз-ым || пхыры-кӏы-гъ
|-
| ||  || 
|-
| boy (abs.) || forest (erg.) || (s)he passed through
|-
|colspan=3|"The boy passed through the forest."
|}

Beyond (шъхьапы~)
The verbal prefix шъхьапы~ /ʂħaːpə~/ designates movement of an object beyond something. Transference of an object beyond something. for example:

 шъхьэпыкӏын /ʂħapət͡ʃʼən/ to exceed; to go beyond something.
 шъхьэпыхын /ʂħapəxən/ to barely miss someone; to pass something very closely and quickly.
 дзын /d͡zən/ to throw → шъхьэпыдзын /ʂħapəd͡zən/ to throw beyond something.
 плъэн /pɬən/ to look → шъхьэпыплъын /ʂħapəppɬən/ to look beyond something
 пкӏэн /pt͡ʃʼan/ to jump → шъхьэпыппкӏын /ʂħapəpt͡ʃʼən/ to jump beyond something.
 он /wan/ to hit; to shoot → шъхьэпыун /ʂħapəwən/ to shoot beyond something or someone.

{|
|-
| цӏыфыхэмэ || сашъхьэпэплъы
|-
| цӏыфы-хэ-мэ || с-а-шъхьэпэ-плъы
|-
| || 
|-
| people (erg.) || I am looking beyond their heads
|-
|colspan=3|"I am looking beyond the people."
|}

{|
|-
|унэм || мыжъор || шъхьэпыдзын || ӏо 
|-
|унэ-м || мыжъо-р || шъхьэпы-дзы-н || ӏо 
|-
| ||  ||  || 
|-
| house (erg.) || rock (abs.) || to throw beyond || try
|-
|colspan=4|"Try throwing the rock beyond the house."
|}

{|
|-
| Мыжъор || кӏалэм || шъхьэпихэгъ
|-
| Мыжъо-р || кӏалэ-м || шъхьэпи-хэ-гъ
|-
| ||  || 
|-
| rock (abs.) || boy (erg.) || it missed one's head
|-
|colspan=3|"The rock barely passed beyond the boy."
|}

Over (шъхьадэ~)
The verbal prefix шъхьадэ~ /ʂħaːda~/ designates movement of an object over something. Transference of an object over something. for example:

 шъхьэдэкӏын /ʂħapat͡ʃʼən/ to go pass over something.
 дзын /d͡zən/ to throw → шъхьэдэдзын /ʂħadad͡zən/ to throw over something.
 плъэн /pɬən/ to look → шъхьэдэплъын /ʂħadapɬən/ to look over something or someone.
 пкӏэн /pt͡ʃʼan/ to jump → шъхьэдэпкӏын /ʂħadapt͡ʃʼən/ to jump over something.

{|
|-
| къэлапчъэм || кӏалэр || шъхьэдэплъы
|-
| къэлапчъэ-м || кӏалэ-р || шъхьэдэплъы
|-
| ||  || 
|-
| gate (erg.) || boy (abs.) || to look over something
|-
|colspan=3|"The boy is looking over the gate."
|}

{|
|-
|боксым || шъхьэдэпкӏ
|-
|боксым || шъхьэдэ-пкӏ
|-
| || 
|-
| box (erg.) || jump over something
|-
|colspan=3|"Jump over the box."
|}

Adjacent (кӏэлъыры~)
The verbal prefix кӏэлъыры~ /t͡ʃʼaɬərə~/ designates action adjacent to something, for example:
 кӏэлъырысын /t͡ʃʼaɬərəsən/ to sit adjacent to something or someone.
 кӏэлъырытын /t͡ʃʼaɬərətən/ to stand adjacent to something or someone.
 кӏэлъырыон /t͡ʃʼaɬərəwan/ to hit adjacent to something or someone.
 кӏэлъырыкӏын /t͡ʃʼaɬərət͡ʃʼən/ to move away adjacent from something or someone.

{|
|-
| кӏалэхэр || машӏом ||кӏэлъырысых
|-
| кӏалэ-хэ-р || машӏо-м ||кӏэлъыры-сы-х
|-
| ||  || 
|-
| the boys (abs.) || fire (erg.) ||they are siting adjacent to
|-
|colspan=3|"The boys are sitting adjacent to the fire."
|}

Spread to different directions (Зэбгы~)
The verbal prefix Зэбгы~ /zabɣə~/ indicates the spread of action in different directions.
 зэбгырыфын /zabɣəfən/ to scatter driving away
 зэбгырыон /zabɣəfən/ to fall to pieces
 зэбгырыдзын /zabɣərəd͡ʒən/ to scatter by throwing
 зэбгырыкӏын /zabɣərət͡ʃʼən/ to disperse (in different directions)

On the neck (шӏохэ~)
The verbal prefix шӏохэ~ /ʃʷʼaxa~/ designates action directed to the neck for example:
 шӏохэлъын /ʃʷʼaxaɬən/ to be wore on one's neck.
 шӏохэфэн /ʃʷʼaxafan/ to fit on one's neck.
 шӏохэзын /ʃʷʼaxazən/ to fall from one's neck.
 шӏохэлъхьэн  /ʃʷʼaxaɬħan/ to wear on one's neck.
 дзын /d͡zən/ to throw → шӏохэдзэн /ʃʷʼaxad͡zan/ to throw on one's neck.
 плъэн /pɬən/ to look → шӏохэплъэн /ʃʷʼaxapɬan/ to look on one's neck.
 пкӏэн /pt͡ʃʼan/ to jump → шӏохэпкӏын /ʃʷʼaxapapt͡ʃʼən/ to jump on one's neck.

{|
|-
| пшъэдалъхьэр || къэсшӏохалъхь
|-
| пшъэдалъхь-р || къэ-с-шӏоха-лъхь
|-
| || 
|-
| necktie (abs.) || Wear it on my neck
|-
|colspan=2|"Wear the necktieon my neck."
|}

{|
|-
|кӏалэм || джэгъукӏэлъ || шӏохэлъ
|-
|кӏалэ-м || джэгъукӏэлъ || шӏохэ-лъ
|-
| ||  || 
|-
| boy (erg.) || necklace || it is wore on one's neck
|-
|colspan=3|"The necklace is wore on the boy's neck."
|}

Informative prefixes
Informative prefixes add additional information related to the verb like the location, the reason and the participants.

Definiteness (къэ~)
The prefix къэ~ /qa~/ can also be used to add a tinge of definiteness to the verb. In this case the verb does not necessarily have to be done towards the speaker. For example:

{|
|-
|кӏалэр|| къэгущыӏэ
|-
|кӏалэ-р|| къэ-гущыӏэ
|-
| || 
|-
| boy (abs.) || (s)he speaks
|-
|colspan=2|"The boy speaks."
|}

{|
|-
|кӏалэр|| пщынэм || къео
|-
|кӏалэ-р|| пщынэ-м || къ-ео
|-
| ||  ||  
|-
| boy (abs.) || accordion (erg.) || (s)he worked
|-
|colspan=3|"The boy is playing the accordion."
|}

{|
|-
|кӏалэр|| ӏофым || макӏуи || къэлэжьагъ
|-
|кӏалэ-р|| ӏофэ-ым || макӏу-и || къэ-лэжь-агъ
|-
| ||  ||  ||  
|-
| boy (abs.) || work / job (erg.) || (s)he went and || (s)he worked
|-
|colspan=4|"The boy went to work and worked."
|}

Causative (гъэ~)
The verbal suffix гъэ~ (ʁ~) designates causation; rendered by the verbs. It designates that the object was forced to, compelled to, made to, was ordered to, was allowed to, was permitted to, was given the opportunity to do something. Verbs receive an additional argument in the causative construction, i.e. their valence is increased by one. All Adyghe verbs can form the causative, including intransitives, transitives, and ditransitives.

Examples :
 кӏо! /kʷʼa/ go! → гъакӏу /ʁaːkʷʼ/ make him go!
 макӏо! /maːkʷʼa/ he is going → егъакӏо /jaʁaːkʷʼa/ he is making him go.
 къакӏу /qaːkʷʼ/ come! → къэгъакӏу /qaʁaːkʷʼ/ make him come back!
 ӏо /ʔʷa/ say! → гъаӏу /ʁaːʔʷ/ make him say!
 шхэ /ʃxa/ eat! → гъашх /ʁaːʃx/ make him eat!; feed him!
 машхэ /maːʃxa/ he is eating → егъашхэ /jaʁaːʃxa/ he is making him eat; he is feeding him.

{|
|-
| фылымым || сегъэплъ
|-
| фылым-ым || се-гъэ-плъ
|-
| ||  
|-
| film (erg.) || let me watch it
|-
|colspan=2|"let me watch the film."
|}

{|
|-
| шъхьэхъор || ӏанэм ||тэгъауцу
|-
| шъхьэхъо-р || ӏанэ-м ||тэ-гъа-уцу
|-
| ||  || 
|-
|flowerpot (abs.)|| table (erg.) || make it stand on
|-
|colspan=3|"place the flowerpot on the table."
|}

By adding prefix гъэ- (ʁa-), it is possible to create transitive verbs from nouns, adjectives and intransitive verbs.

Examples :
 фабэ /faːba/ hot → гъэфаб /ʁafaːb/ make it hot; heat it
 дахэ /daːxa/ pretty → гъэдах /ʁadaːx/ make him/it pretty
 плъыжьы /pɬəʑə/ red → гъэплъыжь /ʁapɬəʑ/ make him/it red
 дышъэ /dəʂa/ gold → гъэдышъ /ʁadəʂ/ make him/it gold
 кӏэхьы /t͡ʃʼaħə/ long → гъэукӏэхьын /ʁat͡ʃʼaħən/ to make it long; to extend; to lengthen
 хьазыр /ħaːzər/ ready → гъэухьэзырын /ʁawħazərən/ to make it ready; to prepare

{|
|-
|санэ|| псым || хапкӏэмэ || егъэплъыжьыщт
|-
|санэ|| псы-м || ха-пкӏэ-мэ || е-гъэ-плъыжьы-щт
|-
| ||  ||  || 
|-
|grape || water (erg.) || if you pour it || he will make it red
|-
|colspan=4|"If you spill grape on water it will make it red"
|}

{|
|-
|фылымыр || бащэу || агъэукӏэхьэгъ
|-
|фылым-ыр || ба-щэ-у || а-гъэ-укӏэхьэ-гъ
|-
| ||  || 
|-
| film (abs.) || a lot (adv.) || they extended it
|-
|colspan=3|"they extended the film too much."
|}

Adyghe allows "double causatives", i.e. the causative suffix can be added to a transitive verb that has already been derived by causativization: thus the causative гъэжъон /ʁaʒʷan/ "make boil, cook" can be causativized to гъэгъэжъон /ʁaʁaʒʷan/ "make someone cook", taking three arguments.

{|
|-
| сэ || пшъашъэм || есгъэгъашхэ || шхыныр || кӏэлэцӏыкӏум
|-
| сэ || пшъашъэ-м || е-с-гъэ-гъ-ашхэ || шхын-ыр || кӏэлэцӏыкӏу-м
|-
| ||  ||  ||  || 
|-
| I || girl (erg.) || I am making him/her feed someone || food (abs.) || little boy (erg.)
|-
|colspan=5|"I am making the girl feed the little boy with the food."
|}

{|
|-
| кӏалэм || егъэгъакӏо || пшъашъэр || кӏэлэцӏыкӏур
|-
| кӏалэ-м || е-гъэ-гъа-кӏо || пшъашъэ-р || кӏэлэцӏыкӏу-р
|-
| ||  ||  || 
|-
| boy (erg.) || (s)he is making him/her make someone go || girl (abs.) || little boy (abs.)
|-
|colspan=4|"The boy is making the girl force then boy to go."
|}

Causative reflexive (зыгъэ~)

A verb that one does to himself has the prefix зыгъэ~ /zəʁa~/

Examples :
 фабэ /faːba/ hot → зыгъэфаб /zəʁafaːb/ heat yourself
 дахэ /daːxa/ pretty → зыгъэдах /zəʁadaːx/ make yourself pretty (usually by clothing)
 кIо! /kʷʼa/ go! → зыгъакIу /zəʁaːkʷʼ/ make yourself go!
 макIо /maːkʷʼa/ he is going → зегъакIо /zeʁaːkʷʼa/ he is making himself go.
 шхэ /ʃxa/ eat! → зыгъашх /zəʁaːʃx/ make yourself eat! or feed yourself!
 машхэх /maːʃxa/ they are eating → загъашхэх /zaːʁaːʃxax/ they are making themselves eat, they are feeding themselves.

{|
|-
|кукунэгъэбылъымкӏэ|| кӏэлэцыкӏухэмэ || загъэбылъы
|-
| ||  || 
|-
|hide and seek (ins.)|| the little boys (erg.) || they are hiding themselves
|-
|colspan=3|"In hide and seek, the little boys are hiding themselves."
|}

{|
|-
|кӏалэм || зыкъемыгъэдел
|-
|кӏалэ-м || зы-къе-мы-гъэ-дел
|-
| || 
|-
|the boy (erg.)|| don't make him fool you
|-
|colspan=2|"don't get the boy fool you."
|}

{|
|-
|кӏалэм || дахэу || зыкъегъэлъагъо || джанэхэмкӏэ
|-
|кӏалэ-м || дахэ-у ||зы-къе-гъэ-лъагъо || джанэ-хэ-мкӏэ
|-
| ||  ||  || 
|-
|the boy (erg.)|| beautify ||(s)he is making himself look || with (using) the clothes (ins.)
|-
|colspan=4|"the boy is making himself look pretty using the clothes"
|}

Time (з~)

To indicate the time a certain verb was done, the prefix з~ (z~) and the past tense suffix ~гъэ (~ʁa) are added. To indicate the time the verb gonna happen, the prefix з~ (z~) and the future tense suffix ~щтэ (~ɕta) are added. For example:

 аукӏэгъ /jaːwt͡ʃʼaʁ/ they killed him → заукӏыгъэр /zaːwt͡ʃʼəʁa/ the time they killed him is
 ышхэгъ /jəʃxaʁ/ (s)he ate it → зышхыгъэр /zəjʃxəʁar/ the time (s)he ate it is
 еплъэгъ /japɬaʁ/ (s)he watched it → зеплъыгъэр /zepɬəʁar/ the time he watched it is
 еплъыщт /japɬəɕt/ (s)he gonna watch it → зеплъыщтэр /zepɬəɕtar/ the time he gonna watch it is 
 мэкӏуагъ /makʷʼaːʁ/ (s)he went → зыкӏуагъэр /zəkʷʼaːʁar/ the time he went is
 мэкӏощт /makʷʼaɕt/ (s)he gonna watch it → зыкӏощтэр /zəkʷʼaɕtar/ the time he gonna go is

{|
|-
| щэджэгъожэ || сэ || сызычъагъэр
|-
| щэджэгъожэ || сэ || сызычъагъэр
|-
| ||  || 
|-
| after noon (abs.) || I || the time I ran
|-
|colspan=3|"The time I ran was after noon."
|}

{|
|-
| кӏалэр || чэщыр || залъэгъугъэр
|-
| ||  || 
|-
| the boy (abs.) || the night (abs.) || the time they saw him
|-
|colspan=3|"The time they saw the boy was the night."
|}

To indicate an event, a plan or something that gonna happen after a certain verb will take place, will have the prefix з- (z-) and the conditional suffix -кӏэ (-t͡ʃʼa) (-гьэ in Shapsug dialect and -джэ in Bzhedugh dialect). For example:

 макӏо /maːkʷʼa/ (s)he is going → зыкӏокӏэ /zəkʷʼat͡ʃʼa/ at the time (s)he goes.
 сэкӏо /sakʷʼa/ I am going → сызкӏокӏэ /səzkʷʼat͡ʃʼa/ at the time I go.
 еплъы /japɬə/ (s)he is looking at it → зеплъыкӏэ /zajpɬət͡ʃʼa/ at the time (s)he looks at it.
 уеплъы /wajpɬə/ you are looking at it → узеплъыкӏэ /wzajpɬət͡ʃʼa/ at the time you gonna look at it.
 елъэгъу /jaɬaʁʷə/ (s)he is seeing it → зилъэгъукӏэ /zəjɬaʁʷət͡ʃʼa/ at the time (s)he sees it.
 сэбэлъэгъу /sabaɬaʁʷə/ you are seeing me → сызыбэлъэгъукӏэ /səzəbɬaʁʷət͡ʃʼa/ at the time you will see me.
 реӏо /rajʔʷa/ (s)he is saying it to him → зриӏокӏэ /zrəjʔʷat͡ʃʼa/ at the time (s)he gonna say it to him.
 уесэты /wajsatə/ I am giving you to him → узестыкӏэ /wzajstət͡ʃʼa/ at the time I will give you to him.

{|
|-
| кӏалэр || макӏоу || зыплъэгъукӏэ  || къысадж
|-
| кӏалэ-р || макӏо-у || зы-п-лъэгъу-кӏэ  || къы-са-дж
|-
| ||  ||   || 
|-
| boy (abs.) || while (s)he is going || at the time you see it || call me
|-
|colspan=4|"At the time you see the boy is going, call me."
|}

{|
|-
| фылымэр || къызежьэкӏэ || къыосӏощт || зэрэкъежьагъэр
|-
| фылым-эр || къы-зе-жьэ-кӏэ || къы-о-с-ӏо-щт || зэрэ-къ-ежь-агъ-эр
|-
| ||  ||  || 
|-
| the film (abs.) || at the time it starts || I will tell you || the moment it started
|-
|colspan=4|"At the time the film starts I will tell you it is started."
|}

{|
|-
| сызкъэплъэгъукӏэ || еплъ || джанэу || къэсщыгъым
|-
|сы-з-къэ-п-лъэгъу-кӏэ|| еплъ || джанэ-у || къэ-с-щыгъэ-м
|-
| ||  ||  || 
|-
| when you see me || look || shirt (adv.) || the thing I am wearing (erg.)
|-
|colspan=4|"When you see me, look at what I am wearing."
|}

{|
|-
|банкэр || затыгъукӏэ || пулисым || феу
|-
| ||  ||  || 
|- 
| the bank (abs.) || when they steal it from ||the police (erg.)|| call him
|-
|colspan=4|"When they rob the bank, call the police."
|}

To indicate an event that happened after a certain verb took place on a certain time, the prefix з- (z-) and suffix -эм (-am) are added. For example:

 аукӏэгъ /jaːwt͡ʃʼaʁ/ they killed him → заукӏым /zaːwt͡ʃʼəm/ when they killed him.
 ышхэгъ /jəʃxaʁ/ (s)he ate it → зешхым /zeʃxəm/ when he ate it.
 еплъэгъ /japɬaʁ/ (s)he looked at it → зеплъым /zepɬəm/ when he looked at it.
 мэкӏуагъ /makʷʼaːʁ/ (s)he went → зэкӏом /zakʷʼam/ when he went.

{|
|-
|кӏалэр|| тучаным || зэкӏом || силъэгъогъ
|-
| ||  ||  
|-
| the boy (abs.) || to the shop (erg.) || when (s)he went || (s)he saw me
|-
|colspan=3|"When the boy went to the shop he saw me."
|}

{|
|-
|кӏалэр || зэгуабжым || къэтлъежагъ
|-
| ||  || 
|-
| the boy (abs.) || when (s)he got angry || (s)he chased after us
|-
|colspan=3|"When the boy got angry he chased after us."
|}

Location (щ~)
The verbal prefix щ~ (ɕ~) designates abode/residence somewhere. It is used to indicate the location or place an action occurred. For example:
машхэ /maːʃxa/ – (s)he is eating → щэшхэ /ɕaʃxa/ – (s)he is eating on that place
макӏо /maːkʷʼa/ – (s)he is going → щэкӏо /ɕakʷʼa/ – (s)he is going on that place
сеплъы /sajpɬə/ – I am looking at it → сыщеплъы /səɕajpɬə/ – I am looking at it on that place
седжагъ /sajd͡ʒaːʁ/ – I studied  → сыщеджагъ /səɕajd͡ʒaːʁ/ – I studied at that place
реӏо /rajʔʷa/ – (s)he is telling him/her → щреӏо /ɕraʔʷa/ – (s)he is telling him/her at that place

{|
|-
|кӏалэр || щагум || щэджэгу
|-
|кӏалэ-р || щагу-м || щэ-джэгу
|-
| ||   || 
|-
|the boy (abs.)|| yard (erg.) || (s)he is playing at that place
|-
|colspan=3|"the boy is playing in the yard."
|}

{|
|-
|кӏалэр || еджапӏэм || непэ || щеджагъ
|-
|кӏалэ-р || еджапӏэ-м || непэ || щ-еджэ-агъ
|-
| ||   ||   ||  
|-
|the boy (abs.)|| school (erg.) || today ||  (s)he studied in that place
|-
|colspan=4|"the boy studied in school today."
|}

{|
|-
|кӏалэр || тучаным || къэсщэӏукӏагъ
|-
|кӏалэ-р || тучан-ым || къэ-с-щэ-ӏукӏэ-агъ
|-
| ||   || 
|-
|the boy (abs.)|| shop (erg.) || I met him/her on that place
|-
|colspan=3|"I met the boy in the shop."
|}

Comitative (дэ~)

The verbal prefix дэ~ (da~) designates action performed jointly with somebody, or stay/sojourn with somebody, for example:

машхэ /maːʃxa/ – (s)he is eating → дашхэ /daːʃxa/ – (s)he is eating with him
макӏо /maːkʷʼa/ – (s)he is going → дакӏо /daːkʷʼa/ – (s)he is going with him
щыс /ɕəc/ – (s)he sits → дэщыс /daɕəs/ – (s)he is sitting with him
тэкӏо /takʷʼa/ – we are going → тыдакӏо /tədaːkʷʼa/ – we are going with him
сеплъы /sajpɬə/ – I am looking at it → сыдеплъы /qasdajpɬə/ – I am looking at it with him
реӏо /rajʔʷa/ – (s)he is telling it to him → дреӏо /drajʔʷa/ – (s)he is telling it to someone with him

{|
|-
|кӏалэр || пшъашъэм || дакӏо
|-
|кӏалэ-р || пшъашъэ-м || д-макӏо
|-
| ||   || 
|-
|the boy (abs.)|| the girl (erg.) || he is going with
|-
|colspan=3|"the boy is going with the girl"
|}

{|
|-
| шхынэр || къэсдэшх
|-
| шхын-эр || къэ-с-дэ-шх
|-
| || 
|-
| the food (abs.)|| eat it with me
|-
|colspan=2|"eat the food with me"
|}

{|
|-
|кӏалэр || лӏыхэмэ || адэлажьэ || яӏофкӏэ
|-
|кӏалэ-р || лӏы-хэ-мэ || а-дэ-лажьэ || я-ӏоф-кӏэ
|-
| ||   ||  || 
|-
|the boy (abs.)|| old men (erg.) || he is working with them || with their works (ins.)
|-
|colspan=4|"the boy is working with the men with their work."
|}

Benefactive (фэ~)

The prefix фэ~ /fa~/ designates action performed to please somebody, for somebody's sake or in somebody's interests.

машхэ /maːʃxa/ – (s)he is eating → фашхэ /faːʃxa/ – (s)he is eating for him
макӏо /maːkʷʼa/ – (s)he is going → факӏо /faːkʷʼa/ – (s)he is going for him
тэкӏо /takʷʼa/ – we are going → тыфакӏо /fədaːkʷʼa/ – we are going for him
сеплъы /sajpɬə/ – I am looking at it → сыфеплъы /qasfajpɬə/ – I am looking at it for him
реӏо /rajʔʷa/ – (s)he is telling it to him → фреӏо /frajʔʷa/ – (s)he is telling it to someone for him

{|
|-
|кӏалэр || иянэ || тучаным || фэкӏо
|-
|кӏалэ-р || и-янэ || тучан-ым || фэ-кӏо
|-
| ||   ||    ||
|-
|the boy (abs.)|| his other || shop (erg.) || (s)he is going with for
|-
|colspan=4|"the boy is going for his mother."
|}

{|
|-
|уатэр || сэ || къэсфэхь
|-
|уатэ-р || сэ || къэ-с-фэ-хь
|-
| ||  ||
|-
|hammer (abs.)|| I || bring it for me
|-
|colspan=3|"bring me the hammer."
|}

{|
|-
|ащ || непэ || гъончэдж || зыфищэфыжьыгъ
|-
|ащ || непэ || гъончэдж || зы-ф-ищэфы-жь-ыгъ
|-
| ||  ||   || 
|-
| (s)he (erg.) || today || pants || (s)he bought it for himself
|-
|colspan=4|"today (s)he bought pants for himself."
|}

Malefactive (шӏо~) 
The verbal prefix шӏо~ (ʃʷʼa~) designates action done against somebody's will or interest. It also designates that the action was done to take an object or an opportunity away from somebody else, for example:

шӏуекӏы /ʃʷʼajt͡ʃʼə/ – (s)he is getting away from him
етыгъу /jatəʁʷə/ – (s)he is stealing it → шӏуетыгъу /ʃʷʼajtəʁʷə/ – (s)he is stealing it from him
ехьы /jaħə/ – (s)he is taking it → шӏуехьы /ʃʷʼajħə/ – (s)he is taking it away from him
ешхы /jaʃxə/ – (s)he is eating it → шӏуешхы /ʃʷʼajʃxə/ – (s)he is consuming someone's food or property
макӏо /maːkʷʼa/ – (s)he is going → шӏуакӏо /ʃʷʼaːkʷʼa/ – (s)he is going away from him; (s)he is losing it

{|
|-
|кӏалэм  || мыӏэрысыр  || къэсшӏуешхы
|-
|кӏалэ-м  || мыӏэрыс-ыр  || къэ-с-шӏу-ешхы
|-
| ||  || 
|-
|boy (erg.) || apple (abs.)||  (s)he is eating it against my interest
|-
|colspan=3|"The boy is eating the apple against my interest."
|}

It can be understood from the sentence that "the boy (кӏалэ) is eating the apple (мыӏэрыс) to take away my opportunity to eat it myself".

{|
|-
|сишхын|| къэсшӏобэшхыжьы
|-
|си-шхын|| къэ-с-шӏо-бэ-шхы-жьы
|-
| || 
|-
|my food|| you are eating it instead of me
|-
|colspan=2|"You are eating my food!"
|}
{|
|-
|Видео джэгумкӏэ || сицӏыф || кӏалэм ||къэсшӏуиукӏыгъ
|-
|Видео джэгу-мкӏэ || си-цӏыф || кӏалэ-м ||къэ-с-шӏуи-укӏы-гъ
|-
| ||  ||  || 
|-
| with the video game (ins.) || my human || the boy (erg.) ||(s)he killed it against me
|-
|colspan=5|"(S)he killed my human in the video game."
|}

{|
|-
|кӏалэм || мыеу|| чъыгым || къыпигъэтэкъухэрэр || пшъашъэм || шӏуештэжьых
|-
|кӏалэ-м || мые-у|| чъыгы-м || къы-пи-гъэ-тэкъу-хэ-рэ-р || пшъашъэ-м || шӏу-ештэ-жьы-х
|-
| ||  ||  ||  ||  || 
|-
|boy (erg.) || apple (adv.)|| the tree (erg.) || the ones that (s)he drops from hanging (abs.) || girl (erg.) || (s)he is taking them away from him
|-
|colspan=6|"The girl is taking away the apples the boy dropped from the tree."
|}

Unintentional (ӏэкӏэ~) 
The verbal prefix ӏэкӏэ~ (ʔat͡ʃʼa~) denotes unintentional actions or actions that occurred unexpectedly.

{|
|-
|сикомпютэр || сӏэкӏэкӏосагъ
|-
|си-компютэ-р || с-ӏэкӏэ-кӏос-агъ
|-
| || 
|-
| my computer (abs.) || it switched off unexpectedly to me
|-
|colspan=3|"My computer switched off unexpectedly to me."
|}

{|
|-
|пысмэ|| бэ || сӏэкӏэтхагъ
|-
|пысмэ|| бэ || с-ӏэкӏэ-тх-агъ
|-
| ||  || 
|-
| letter || a lot ||I wrote unintentionally
|-
|colspan=3|"I wrote a lot of letters (though I didn’t intend to write so many)"
|}

{|
|-
|сихьакӏэхэмэ|| зэкӏэ || мыӏэрысхэр  ||сӏэкӏашхыхьагъ
|-
|си-хьакӏэ-хэ-мэ|| зэкӏэ || мыӏэрыс-хэ-р  ||с-ӏэкӏ-а-шхы-хь-агъ
|-
| ||  ||  || 
|-
| my guests (erg.) || all || apples (abs.) || they ate them unexpectedly to me
|-
|colspan=4|"My guests ate all the apples unexpectedly to me."
|}

{|
|-
|сэ || мыӏэрысхэр || сӏэкӏэшхыхьагъ
|-
|сэ || мыӏэрыс-хэ-р || с-ӏэкӏэ-шхы-хь-агъ
|-
| ||  || 
|-
| I || apples (abs.) || I ate them unintentionally 
|-
|colspan=3|"I ate the apples unintentionally."
|}

Instrumental (ре~)
To indicate the tool or instrument the verb was done with, the prefix (ре-) (raj-) is added

макӀо /maːkʷʼa/ – he is going (makʷʼa), рекӀо /rajkʷʼa/ – he is going on it or he is going with it
машхэ /maːʃxa/ – he is eating, решхэ /rajʃxa/ – he is eating with it
сэлажьэ /salaːʑa/ – i am working, сырелажьэ /sərajlaːʑa/ – i am working with it

{|
|-
|къэлэмым|| шъуретхэ
|-
| || 
|-
|the pencil (erg.)|| you (plural) writing with it
|-
|colspan=2|"you (plural) are writing with a pencil"
|}

{|
|-
|къалэм|| сырикӀорагъу
|-
| || 
|-
|the wall (erg.)|| i want to go on it
|-
|colspan=2|"i want to go on the wall"
|}

Reflexive (зэ~)
To indicate a verb that the subject does to himself, the suffix зэ- (za-) is added. verbs in reflexive also usually have the suffix -жьы (-ʑə).

мэзао /mazaːwa/ – he fights → зэзэожьы /zazawaʑə/ – (s)he fights himself.
мэзаох /mazaːwax/ – they fight → зэзэожьых /zazawaʑəx/ – they are fighting themselves.
маплъэ /maːpɬa/ – He looks → зэплъыжьы /zapɬəʑə/ – (s)he looks at himself.
еплъых /japɬəx/ – They are looking at → зэплъыжьых /zapɬəʑəx/ – They are looking at themselves.
уемыплъ /wajməpɬ/ – don't look at → узэмыплъыжьы /wəzaməpɬəʑ/ – don't look at yourself.
сэукӏы /sawt͡ʃʼə/ – I am killing → /zasawt͡ʃʼəʑə/ – зэсэукӏыжьы /zasawt͡ʃʼəʑə/ – I am killing myself.

{|
| Гъунджэмкӏэ || зэплъыжь
|-
| || 
|-
| using the mirror (ins.) || look at yourself
|-
|colspan=2|"Look at yourself in the mirror."
|}

{|
|Сыкъызэгъэлъэгъу || уиджанэ || кӏэхэ || къыпшыгъэхэу
|-
| ||  ||   || 
|-
| Let me see you || Your shirt || news || while you are wearing them
|-
|colspan=4|"Let me see you wearing your new shirts."
|}

It can also be used to indicate a verb that some subjects (more than one; group) do to themselves.

{|
| Кӏалэмрэ || пшъашъэмрэ || зэбэух
|-
| Кӏалэ-м-рэ || пшъашъэ-м-рэ || зэ-бэу-х
|-
| ||  || 
|-
| the boy and (abs.) || the girl and (abs.)  || they are kissing each other
|-
|colspan=3|"The boy and the girl are kissing each other."
|}

{|
|Шъузэзэонэу || шъуфаемэ || мэу || шъузэмызау
|-
| ||  ||   || 
|-
| You (plural) (to) fight each other || if you (plural) want || here || don't fight each other (said to plural)
|-
|colspan=4|"If you wanna fight each other, don't fight here"
|}

Comitative reflexive (зэдэ~)

To indicate a verb that is done by some subjects (more than one; group) together, the suffix зэдэ~ (zada~) is added.

мэзаон /mazaːwan/ – to fight → зэдэзэон /zadazawan/ – to fight together.
мэкӏон /makʷʼan/ – to walk → зэдэкӏон /zadaakʷʼan/ – to walk together.
еон /jawan/ – to hit → зэдэон /zadawan/ – to strike together.
плъэн /pɬan/ – to look → зэдэплъэн /zadapɬan/ – to look together.

{|
|Сиунэ || тисэу || тызэдэшхэщт
|-
| ||  || 
|-
| my house || while we are sitting inside || we will eat together
|-
|colspan=3|"We will eat together while sitting in my house."
|}

{|
| Томымрэ Джекобрэ || тестэр || зэдашӏы
|-
| ||   || 
|-
| Tom and Jacob || the test (arg.) || they are doing it together
|-
|colspan=3|"Tom and Jacob are doing the test together."
|}

Reciprocity (зэры~)

Transitive verb in the reciprocal form expresses that its two core arguments (the Actor and the Undergoer) act on each other simultaneously. The reciprocal form has the prefix зэры~ (zara~), for example:

зэрылъaгъун "to see each other".
зэрыӏукӏэн "to meet each other".
зэрыхьын "to carry each other".

{|
| Оррэ || сэррэ || тызэрэлъэгъу
|-
| Ор-рэ || сэр-рэ || ты-зэрэ-лъэгъу
|-
| you and || me and || we see each other
|-
|colspan=3|"We see each other."
|}

Functionally (зэрэ~)
To indicate the way a certain action is performed, the prefix зэрэ~ (zara~) and the suffix ~рэ /~ra/ are added.

макӏо /maːkʷa/ – he walks → зэракӏорэ /zaraːkʷara/ – how (s)he walks; the way (s)he walks
мэлажьэ /maɮaːʑa/ – (s)he is working → зэрэлажьэрэ /zaraɮaːʑara/ – how (s)he works; the way (s)he works
еплъы /japɬə/ – (s)he looks at → зэреплъырэ /zarajpɬəra/ – the way (s)he looks at
едзы /jad͡zə/ – (s)he throws → зэридзырэ /zarəjd͡zəra/ – the way (s)he throws it
фабэ /faːba/ – hot → зэрэфабэ /zarafaːba/ –  the way it is hot
шъуцӏэ /ʃʷʼət͡sʼa/ – black → зэрэшъуцӏэ  /zaraʃʷʼət͡sʼa/ – the way it is black

{|
|-
| кӏалэр || псынкӏэу || зэрачъэрэ || олъэгъуа?
|-
| кӏалэ-р || псынкӏэ-у || зэрэ-чъэ-рэ || о-лъэгъу-а?
|-
| ||  ||  || 
|-
| the boy (abs.) || quickly ||the way (s)he runs || do you see it?
|-
|colspan=4|"do you see the way the boy runs fast?"
|}

{|
|-
| пшъашъэр ||зэратхэрэр || дахэ
|-
| пшъашъэi-р ||зэра-матхэ-рэ-р || дахэ
|-
| ||  || 
|-
| girl (abs.) || the way (s)he writes   || beautiful
|-
|colspan=3|"The way the girl writes is beautiful."
|}

{|
|-
| непэ || зэрэфабэр || хэпшӏыкӏрэба?
|-
| непэ || зэрэ-фабэ-р || хэ-п-шӏыкӏ-рэ-ба?
|-
| ||  || 
|-
|  today || the way it is hot || don't you feel it?
|-
|colspan=3|"Don't you feel how it is hot today?"
|}

The prefix зэрэ~ (zara~) and the suffix ~рэ /~ra/ can also be used to indicate a fact.

макӏо /maːkʷa/ – he walks → зэракӏорэ /zaraːkʷara/ – the fact (s)he goes
мэлажьэ /maɮaːʑa/ – (s)he is working → зэрэлажьэрэ /zaraɮaːʑara/ – how fact (s)he works
еплъы /japɬə/ – (s)he looks at → зэреплъырэ /zarajpɬəra/ – the fact (s)he looks
фабэ /faːba/ – hot → зэрэфабэ /zarafaːba/ – the fact it is hot.
шъуцӏэ /ʃʷʼət͡sʼa/ – black → зэрэшъуцӏэ /zaraʃʷʼət͡sʼa/ – the fact it is black.

{|
|-
| лӏыжъыр || зэрэхъужьыгъэр || пшӏагъэба?
|-
| лӏыжъ-ыр || зэрэ-хъужьы-гъэ-р || п-шӏ-агъэ-ба?
|-
| ||  || 
|-
| old man (abs.) || the fact (s)he became healthy again || didn't you know"
|-
|colspan=3|"Didn't you know the old man became healthy again?"
|}

{|
|-
| пшъашъэр ||зэрэдахэр || сылъэгъогъ
|-
| пшъашъэр ||зэрэ-дахэ-р || сы-лъэгъо-гъ
|-
| ||  || 
|-
| girl (abs.) || the fact (s)he is pretty  || I saw
|-
|colspan=3|"I saw that the girl is pretty."
|}

{|
|-
| унэшъуа? || ор || зэрэплъыжьэ || улъэгъурэба?
|-
| у-нэшъу-а? || ор || зэрэ-плъыжьэ || у-лъэгъу-рэ-ба?
|-
| ||  ||  || 
|-
| are you blind? || that (arg.) || the fact it is red || don't you see it?
|-
|colspan=4|"are you blind? don't you see it is red?"
|}

Instantly  after (зэрэ~) and (~эу)
To indicate an event that happened instantly at the beginning of a certain verb, the prefix зэрэ- (zara-) and the suffix -эу / -ыу (-aw/-əw) are added. Can only be used on verbs and nouns.

макӏо /maːkʷa/ – he walks → зэрэмакӏоу /zaramaːkʷaw/ – as he started walking
мэлажьэ /maɮaːʑa/ – he is working → зэрэмэлажьэу /zaramaɮaːʑaw/ – as he began working
еплъы /japɬə/ – he looks at → зэреплъэу /zarajapɬaw/ – as he started looking at
къэушӏуцӏэгъ /qawʃʷʼət͡sʼaʁ/ – it became black → зэрэкъэушӏуцӏэгъэу /zaraqawʃʷʼət͡sʼaʁ/ – as it became black
мафэ /maːfa/ – day → зэрэмафэу /zaramaːfaw/ – as it was day
фабэ /faːba/ – hot → зэрэфабэу /zarafaːbaw/ – as it was hot

{|
|-
| кӏалэр || псы || зэрешъоу || сыкъэсэгъ
|-
| кӏалэ-р || псы || зэрэ-ешъо-у || сы-къэсы-эгъ
|-
| ||  ||  || 
|-
| the boy (abs.) || water ||as he started drinking || I got here
|-
|colspan=4|"as the boy started drinking water I got here"
|}

{|
|-
| кӏалэр || еджапӏэм || зэрежьэу || къещхэу || къиублагъ
|-
| кӏалэ-р || еджапӏэ-м || зэрэ-ежь-эу || къещхы-эу || къеублэ-агъ
|-
| ||  ||  ||  || 
|-
| the boy (abs.) || the school (erg.) || as he started || while it was raining || (s)he/it started
|-
|colspan=5|"as the boy started to go to school, it started to rain."
|}

Verbal Infixes

Negative (~мы~)
It is posited most often before root of verb, after all other prefixes.
кIо /kʷʼa/ "go" → умыкIу /wəməkʷʼ/ "don't go"
Iо (Iуэ) /ʔʷa/ "say" → умыIу /wməʔʷ/ "don't say"
шъушх /ʂʷʃx/ "eat (plural)" → шъумышх /ʂʷəməʃx/ "don't eat (plural)"

When to use this Prefix :
In Imperative case (To order someone to do a certain verb) – умыкӀу /wəməkʷʼ/ "don't go".
In case to use together with the suffixes -ми (-mi), -эм (-am), -мэ (-ma), -ыу (-əw) and -и (-i) –

умыкӀомэ /wəmkʷʼama/ "if you don't go", умыкӀорагъоми /wəmkʷʼaraːʁʷami/ "even if you don't want to

go", мамкӀуу /maːmkʷʼəw/ "while he didn't want to go".
In Infinitive suffix – мэмкӀон /wamkʷʼan/ "to not go".

{|
|-
|Ащтыу || умышI!
|-
| || ||
|-
|like that || don't do it
|-
|colspan=2|"Do not do this"
|}

{|
|-
|ау || шъумыкӏу!
|-
| || ||
|-
|there || don't go (plural)
|-
|colspan=2|"Don't go there (Said to several people)"
|}

{|
|-
|зыгори || ащ || ешъумыӏу
|-
| || || 
|-
|something || him/that || don't tell him (plural)
|-
|colspan=3|"Do not tell him anything"
|}

Cannot be used simultaneously with both the negative prefix (мы~) (mə~) and the negative suffix (-п) (-p).

Optative mood (~рэ~)
To indicate a verb that someone wishes to happen, the verbal infix ~рэ~ (~ra~) is added.

Examples :
макӏо /maːkʷʼa/ – (s)he goes → мэрэкӏу /marakʷʼ/ – may (s)he go.
малӏэрэп /maːɬʼarap/ – (s)he doesn't die → мэрэмылӏ /maraməɬʼ/ – may (s)he won't die.
охъужьы /waχʷəʑə/ – you are becoming healthy again → орэхъужь /waraχʷəʑ/ – may you become healthy again.
сыкӏуачӏэ /səkʷʼaːt͡ʂʼa/ – I am strong → сэрэкӏуачӏ /sarakʷʼaːt͡ʂʼ/ – may I be strong.
удахэ /wədaːxa/ – you are beautiful → орэдах /waradaːx/ – may you become beautiful.

{|
|-
| мы || уцым || уерэгъэхъужь
|-
| мы || уцы-м || у-е-рэ-гъэ-хъу-жь
|-
| || ||  ||
|-
| this || plant (erg.) || may it cure you
|-
|colspan=3|"may this plant cure you"
|}

{|
|-
| кӏалэм || сишхын || ерэшх
|-
| кӏалэ-м || си-шхын || е-рэ-шх
|-
| || ||  ||
|-
| boy (erg.) || my food || may (s)he eat it
|-
|colspan=3|"may the boy just eat my food."
|}

{|
|-
| кӏалэр ||мэрэмыкӏуи || джары
|-
| || ||  ||
|-
| the boy (abs.) || may (s)he doesn't go then || that's it
|-
|colspan=3|"If the boy just won't go that's it."
|}

Verbal Suffixes

Interrogative mood (~а)
Questions are indicated by the suffix ~a /aː/, which, in verbs that end with /a/, lengthens the end vowel.
макӏо /maːkʷʼa/ "he is going" → макӏуа? /maːkʷʼaː/ "is he going?"
мэтхагъ /matxaːʁ/ "he wrote" → мэтхагъа? /matxaːʁaː/ "did he wrote?"
кӏалэр машхэ /t͡ʃʼaːɮar maːʃxa/ "the boy is eating" → кӏалэр машха? /t͡ʃʼaːɮar maːʃxaː/ "is the boy eating?"
шъокӏо /ʃʷakʷʼa/ "you (plural) are going → шъокӏуа? /ʃʷakʷʼaː/ "are you (plural) going?"
отхэ /watxa/ "you are writing" → отха? /watxaː/ "are you writing?"
машхэх /maːʃxax/ "they are eating" → машхэха? /maːʃxaxaː/ "are they eating?"

{|
|-
| кӏалэр || къэущыжьыгъа?
|-
| кӏалэ-р || къэущыжь-агъ-а
|-
| || 
|-
| the boy (arg.) || did (s)he woke up?
|-
|colspan=2|"Did the boy woke up?"
|}

{|
|-
| дэгуха || мы || унэм || исыхэр?
|-
| дэгу-х-а || мы || унэ-м || ис-ыхэ-р
|-
| || ||  ||  
|-
| are they deaf? || this || house || the people that are in
|-
|colspan=4|"Are the people that are in this house deaf?"
|}

If question is posited to word having negative suffix ~п (~p), it is converted to suffix ~ба (~baː). for example:

макӏуа? /maːkʷʼaː/ "is he going?" → макӏоба? /maːkʷʼabaː/ "isn't he going?"
ошӏа /waʃʼaː/ "do you know?" → ушӏэрэба? /pʃʼarabaː/ "don't you know?"
мэтхагъа /matxaːʁaː/ "did he wrote" → мэтхагъэба? /matxaːʁabaː/ "didn't he wrote?"
кӏалэр машха /t͡ʃʼaːɮar maːʃxaː/ "is the boy is eating?" → кӏалэр машхэба? /t͡ʃʼaːɮar maːʃxabaː/ "isn't the boy eating?"
шъокӏуа /ʃʷakʷʼaː/ "are you (plural) going? → шъокӏоба? /ʃʷakʷʼabaː/ "aren't you (plural) going?"
сыдаха /sədaːxaː/ "am I look beautiful" → сыдахэба /sədaːxabaː/ "doesn't I look beautiful"

{|
|-
|кӏалэр || къэущыжьыгъэба?
|-
| ||
|-
|boy (abs.) || isn't he woke up?
|-
|colspan=2|"Has not the boy woke up?"
|}

{|
|-
|кӏалэр || тиунэ || къакӏорэба?
|-
| || ||
|-
|boy (abs.) || our house ||  isn't he coming?
|-
|colspan=3|"Isn't the boy coming to my house?"
|}

{|
|-
|кӏалэр || тиунэ || къакӏоба?
|-
| || ||
|-
|boy (abs.) || our house || he is coming to right?
|-
|colspan=3|"The boy is coming to my house right?"
|}

Optative mood (~гъот)
Optative mood is expressed with the complex suffix ~гъот or ~гъует or ~гъэмэ :

укIуа-гъот "If only you had gone".
птхы-гъагъот "If only you had written".
сыкӏо-гъагъует: If only I had gone.
седжэ-гъагъоет: If only I had studied.
сыкӏо-гъагъэмэ: If only I had gone.
седжэ-гъамэ: If only I had studied.

{|
|-
|экзамыным || сыфеджэгъагъот, || джэщгъум || дэгъоу || сышӏышъущтыгъ
|-
| ||  ||  ||  || 
|-
|exam (erg.)|| if only I studied for it || then || good (adv.) || I could have done it 
|-
|colspan=5|"If only I would have studied for the exam, then I could have done it good."
|}

Frequentative (~жь)
The verbal suffix ~жь (~ʑ) designates recurrence/repetition of action. It can also be used to indicate an action that someone was doing before and now continuing it.

Examples :
 кӏо! /kʷʼa/ go → кӏожь /kʷʼaʑ/ go back
 къакӏу /qaːkʷʼ/ come → къакӏожь /qaːkʷʼaʑ/ come back
 къаӏу /qaːʔʷ/ say → къэӏожь /qaʔʷaʑ/ say again
 шхэ /ʃxa/ eat → шхэжь /ʃxaʑ/ eat again
 шхы /ʃxə/ eat it → шхыжь /ʃxəʑ/ eat it again; continue eating it

In case the verb is being continued :

{|
|-
| уиунэ || кӏожьи || уиӏанэ || лэжь
|-
| уи-унэ || кӏо-жь-и || уи-ӏанэ || лэ-жь
|-
| ||  ||  || 
|-
|your house || go back and || your table || color it again
|-
|colspan=4|"Go back to your house and continue coloring your table."
|}

In case the verb is being repeated :

{|
|-
| фылымым || зэдегъэплъыжь
|-
| фылым-ым || зэ-де-гъэ-плъы-жь
|-
| || 
|-
| film (erg.) || let us watch it again together
|-
|colspan=2|"Let us watch the film again together."
|}

In case the verb is being repeated by someone else :

{|
|-
| кӏэлэегъаджэм || къиӏогъагъэр || къэсфэӏотэжь
|-
| кӏэлэегъаджэ-м || къ-и-ӏо-гъагъэ-р || къэ-с-фэ-ӏотэ-жь
|-
| ||  || 
|-
| teacher (erg.) || the thing (s)he said (abs.) || explain it to me
|-
|colspan=3|"Explain me the things the teacher said."
|}

Non-intervention (~жь)
The verbal suffix ~жь (~ʑ) designates performance of the action directly, without the intervention of another agent.

{|
|-
| кӏалэм || тишхынхэр || къэтшӏуешхыжьых
|-
| кӏалэ-м || ти-шхын-хэ-р || къэ-т-шӏу-е-шхы-жьы-х
|-
| ||  || 
|-
| boy (erg.)  || our foods (abs.) || (s)he is eating without an intervention against our interests
|-
|colspan=3|"The boy is eating our foods."
|}

{|
|-
| дэпкъыр || уизакъоу || улэжьын || фай
|-
| дэпкъы-р || уи-закъо-у || у-лэ-жьы-н || фай
|-
| ||  ||  || 
|-
| wall (abs.)  || you alone || (you) to color it without an intervention || must
|-
|colspan=4|"You will have to color the wall alone."
|}

This is also used to designates that the action was completed finally. For example:
 Лӏым иӏоф ышӏэжьыгъ – The man has finished his work (finally)
 Кӏалэм филымым еплъыжьы – The boy is (finally) watching the film

Too late (~жь)
The verbal suffix ~жь (~ʑ) also indicates an action that was done with a great delay, to the point it even might be too late or pointless.

{|
|-
| къэгъэгъэ лӏагъэм || псы || чӏэбэгъэхьажьа?
|-
| къэгъэгъэ лӏагъэ-м || псы || чӏэ-бэ-гъэ-хьа-жь-а?
|-
| ||  || 
|-
| dead flower || water || are you making it go under it just now?
|-
|colspan=3|"Are you watering a dead flower?"
|}

{|
|-
| кӏалэм || нэущы || иэкзамен|| феджэжьы
|-
| кӏалэ-м || нэущы || и-экзамен||  ф-е-джэ-жьы
|-
| || ||   || 
|-
| boy (erg.) || tomorrow || exam || (s)he is studying for it just now
|-
|colspan=5|"The boy is studying for the exam tomorrow."
|}

To indicate to someone, not to bother doing a certain action, the negative infix ~мы~ (~mə~) and the suffix ~жьы (~ʑə) are added.

{|
|-
| чэщы || мэхъумэ || сиунэ || укъэмыкӏожь
|-
| чэщы || мэхъу-мэ || ти-унэ || у-къэ-мы-кӏо-жь
|-
| || ||   || 
|-
| night || if it becomes|| my house ||do not bother coming to my house
|-
|colspan=4|"If it becomes night, don't bother coming to my house."
|}

{|
|-
| цӏыфым || умышӏ|| емыӏожь || ышӏэгъахэу
|-
| цӏыфы-м || у-м-ышӏ|| е-мы-ӏо-жь || ы-шӏы-гъа-хэу
|-
| || ||   || 
|-
| person (erg.) || don't do that || don't bother telling him || after (s)he already done it
|-
|colspan=4|"Don't bother telling the person, "don't do it" after he already done doing it."
|}

Completion (~гъах)
The verbal suffix ~гъах (~ʁaːx) designates absolute accomplishment/realization of the action.

сэкӏо /sakʷʼa/ "I am going" → сыкӏогъах /səkʷʼaʁaːx/ "I already went"
ощхэ /waɕxa/ "you are eating" → ущхэгъах /wəɕxaʁaːx/ "you already ate".
мафэ /maːfa/ – day → мэфэгъах /mafaʁaːx/ – it was already day.
дахэ /daːxa/ – pretty → дэхэгъах /daxaʁaːx/ – (s)he was already pretty.
кӏэхьы /t͡ʃʼaħə/ – long → кӏэхьыгъах /t͡ʃʼaħəʁaːx/ – it was already long.

{|
|-
|кӏалэр|| еджапӏэм || мэкӏогъах
|-
|кӏалэ-р|| еджапӏэ-м || мэкӏо-гъах
|-
| || || 
|-
|the boy (abs.)|| school (erg.) || he already went
|-
|colspan=2|"the boy already went to school."
|}

{|
|-
|тэ|| теджэгъах || экзаменым || Фэшӏыкӏэ
|-
|тэ|| т-еджэ-гъах || экзамен-ым || Фэшӏыкӏэ
|-
| ||  ||  || 
|-
|we|| we already studied || exam (erg.) || for
|-
|colspan=3|"we already studied for the exam."
|}

To indicate an event that is happening after the absolute accomplishment/realization of an action, the suffixes ~гъах (~ʁaːx) and ~эу (~aw) are added. For example:

сэкӏо /sakʷʼa/ "I am going" → сыкӏогъахэу /səkʷʼaʁaːxaw/ "While I done going.
ощхэ /waɕxa/ "you are eating" → ущхэгъахэу /wəɕxaʁaːxaw/ "While you done eating".
мафэ /maːfa/ – day → мэфэгъахэу /mafaʁaːxaw/ – While it was day.

{|
|-
|сымышхэгъахэу|| лаж || къысэмыӏу
|-
|сы-мы-шхэ-гъах-эу|| лаж || къы-сэ-мы-ӏо
|-
| ||  || 
|-
| while I am not done eating || work! (Imperative mood) || don't tell me
|-
|colspan=3|"Don't tell me to work while I haven't done eating"
|}

{|
|-
| мыӏэрысэр || сышхыгъахэу || къысэбэӏожьа || умышх
|-
| мыӏэрысэ-р || сы-шхы-гъах-эу || къы-сэ-бэ-ӏо-жьа || у-мы-шх
|-
| || ||   || 
|-
| apple (abs.) || after I done eating it || are you telling me? || don't eat it!
|-
|colspan=4|"After I done eating the apple, are you telling me not to eat it?"
|}

To indicate an event that happened after the absolute accomplishment/realization of an action, the suffixes -гъах (-ʁaːx) and -эм (-am) are added. For example:

сэкӏо /sakʷʼa/ "I am going" → сыкӏогъахэм /səkʷʼaʁaːxam/ "When I already done going.
ошхэ /waʃxa/ "you are eating" → ущхэгъахэм /wəɕxaʁaːxam/ "When you already done eating".
мафэ /maːfa/ – day → мэфэгъахэм /mafaʁaːxam/ – When it was already a day.

{|
|-
|сылэжьэгъахэм  || сылъэгъогъ || кӏалэр
|-
|сы-лажьэ-гъах-эм  || сы-лъэгъу-эгъ || кӏалэр
|-
| ||  || 
|-
|when i done working|| I saw || the boy (abs.)
|-
|colspan=3|"When I done working, I saw the boy."
|}

{|
|-
| экзаменым || уфеджэгъахэмэ || къэтдэджэгу
|-
| экзамен-ым || у-ф-е-джэ-гъахэ-мэ || къэ-т-дэ-джэгу
|-
| ||  || 
|-
| exam (erg.) || when you done studying for it || play with us
|-
|colspan=3|"When you done studying for the exam, play with us."
|}

To indicate not accomplishment/realization of an action, the suffix -гъах (-ʁaːx) and the negative suffix (~эп) (~ap) are added.

сэкӏо /sakʷʼa/ "I am going" → сыкӏогъахэп /səkʷʼaʁaːxap/ "I still haven't done going.
ошхэ /waʃxa/ "you are eating" → ущхэгъахэп /wəɕxaʁaːxap/ "You still haven't done eating".

{|
|-
| экзаменым || феджэгъахэп || кӏалэр
|-
| экзамен-ым || ф-е-джэ-гъах-эп || кӏалэ-р
|-
| ||  || 
|-
| exam (erg.) || (s)he still have not studied for || boy (abs.)
|-
|colspan=3|"The boy still have not studied for the exam."
|}

{|
|-
|сышхэгъахэп
|-
|
|-
|I haven't done eating
|-
|colspan=1|"I still have not done eating."
|}

While (~эу)
To indicate an event that is happening while a certain verb is done, the suffix ~эу (-aw) is added to the verb. Usually this suffix is added to present tense verbs regardless if the whole sentence is about the past or future. For example:
 сэкӏо /sakʷʼa/ I am going → сыкӏоу /səkʷʼaw/ while I was going
 тэлажьэ /talaːʑa/ we are working → тылажьэу /talaːʑaw/ while we were working
 машхэ /maːʃxa/ (s)he is eating → машхэу /maːʃxaw/ while (s)he was eating

The verb with the suffix ~эу is usually followed by another verb that has a tense suffix indicating the time the sentence occurred. For example:
 сыкӏоу сылъэгъогъ /səkʷʼaw səɬaʁʷaʁ/ while I was going I saw.
 сыкӏоу сэлъэгъу  /səkʷʼaw saɬaʁʷə/ while I am going I see.
 сыкӏоу сылъэгъущт /səkʷʼaw səɬaʁʷəɕt/ while I go I will see.
 сыкӏоу сылъэгъущтэгъ /səkʷʼaw səɬaʁʷəɕtaʁ/ I was going to see while going.

{|
|-
|сыкӏоу|| кӏалэр || слъэгъогъ
|-
| ||  ||
|-
|while I was going|| the boy (erg.) || I saw
|-
|colspan=3|"while I was going, I saw the boy"
|}

{|
|-
| кӏалэр || мэщынэу || псым || хэхьэшъугъэп
|-
| кӏалэ-р || мэщынэ-у || псы-м || хэ-хьэ-шъу-гъэ-п
|-
| ||  || ||
|-
| boy (abs.) || while (s)he was afraid || water (erg.) || (s)he couldn't enter it
|-
|colspan=4|"The boy couldn't enter the water while being afraid."
|}

{|
|-
| зыпакӏэ || сыкӏощтыгъэу || укъысэджагъ 
|-
| зыпакӏэ ||сы-кӏо-щтыгъэ-у || у-къы-сэ-дж-агъ 
|-
| ||  ||
|-
| somewhere || while I was going to go || you called me
|-
|colspan=3|"You called me while I was going to go somewhere."
|}

To indicate an action that occurred instead of another action, the action that did not happen is expressed in the present tense form and it gets the suffix ~эу and the negative infix ~мы~. For example:
 сымыкӏоу сычъагъ /səməkʷʼaw sət͡ʂaːʁ/ instead of going I ran.
 сымыкӏоу сэчъэ /səməkʷʼaw sat͡ʂa/ instead of going I am running.
 сымыкӏоу сычъэщт /səməkʷʼaw sət͡ʂaɕt/ instead of going I will run.
 сымыкӏоу сычъэщтэгъ /səməkʷʼaw sət͡ʂaɕtaʁ/ instead of going I was going to run.

{|
|-
| уемыджэу || тэ || къэтдэджэгу
|-
| уе-мы-джэ-у || тэ || къэ-т-дэ-джэгу
|-
||| ||
|-
|instead of studying || we || play with us
|-
|colspan=3|"Instead of studying play with us."
|}

{|
|-
| умышхэу || лажь
|-
| у-мы-шхэ-у || лажь
|-
||| 
|-
|instead of eating || work
|-
|colspan=2|"Instead of eating work."
|}

{|
|-
| кӏалэр || сэ || синэмым || къэсдэмыкӏоу || пшъашъэм || дэкӏуагъ
|-
| кӏалэ-р || сэ || синэм-ым || къэ-с-дэ-мы-кӏо-у || пшъашъэ-м || дэ-кӏу-агъ
|-
|||  ||  ||  ||  || 
|-
| boy (abs.) || I || cinema (erg.) || instead of coming with me || girl (erg.) || (s)he went with 
|-
|colspan=6|"The boy instead of coming with me went with the girl to the cinema."
|}

To indicate something before a certain verb was done, the suffix ~эу and the negative infix ~мы~ are added. In this case the verb should also get the tense suffix indicating the time.

{|
|-
| унэм || умыкӏыгъэу || зыгъэпсыкӏ
|-
| унэ-м || у-мы-кӏы-гъэу || зы-гъэ-псыкӏ
|-
| ||  ||
|-
| house (erg.) || before you get out of || take a shower
|-
|colspan=3|"Before you get out of the house, take a shower."
|}

{|
|-
| умыджэгугъэу || тӏэкӏу || едж
|-
| у-мы-джэгу-гъэ-у || тӏэкӏу || едж
|-
||| ||
|-
|before you play || a bit || study
|-
|colspan=3|"Before you play study a bit."
|}

{|
|-
| еджапӏэм || семыжьэгъагъэу || къещхэу || къиублэгъагъ
|-
| еджапӏэ-м || се-мы-жьэ-гъагъэ-у || къещхэ-у || къ-иублэ-гъагъ
|-
||| || ||
|-
| school (erg.) || before I started going to || while raining || it started (then)
|-
|colspan=4|"Before I went to school it stated raining."
|}

Plural (~хэ)
In addition to distinguishing between singular and plural nouns by marking the latter with the suffix '-хэ' .

кӏалэ /t͡ʃʼaːɮa/ – boy →  кӏалэхэ /t͡ʃʼaːɮaxa/ – boys.
шхын /ʃxən/ – food →  шхынхэ /ʃxənxa/ – foods.
мафэ /maːfa/ – day → мафэхэ /maːfaxa/ – days.
мэкӏуагъэ /makʷʼaːʁa/ – the one that went → мэкӏуагъэхэ /makʷʼaːʁaxa/ – the ones that went.
макӏорэ /maːkʷʼara/ – the one that is going → макӏохэрэ /maːkʷʼaxara/ – the ones that are going.
мэкӏотэ /makʷʼata/ – the one that will go → мэкӏотхэ /makʷʼatxa/ – the ones that will go.
еджэрэ /jad͡ʒa/ – he one that is reading → еджэхэрэ /jad͡ʒa/ – he ones that are reading
дахэ /daːxa/ – pretty → дахэхэ /daːxəxa/ – the pretty ones.
кӏэхьы /t͡ʃʼaħə/ – long → кӏэхьыхэ /t͡ʃʼaħəxa/ – the long ones.

{|
|-
| у || мэлажьэхэрэр || сишых
|-
| у || мэлажьэ-хэ-рэ-р || си-шы-х
|-
| ||  ||  
|-
| those || the ones that are working (abs.) || they are my brothers
|-
|colspan=3|"Those guys that are working are my brothers"
|}

To indicate a plural verb (verb that was done by more than one thing) also has the additional suffix '-хэ' .

{|
|-
|илъэсхэр || псынкӏэу || блэкӏых
|-
|илъэсхэ-р || псынкӏэ-у || блэкӏ-ых
|-
| ||  || 
|-
|the years (abs.) || fast (adv.) || they are passing
|-
|colspan=3|"the years are passing fast"
|}

Negative (~эп)
The Negation suffix is ~п (~p) and it's ~рэп (~rap) when the verb is

in present tense: 
мэкӀуагъ /makʷʼaːʁ/ – he went → мэкӀуагъэп /makʷʼaːʁap/ – "he did not go".
окIо /wakʷʼa/ "you are going" → уыкIорэп /wəkʷʼarap/ "you are not going"
тыкӀощт /təkʷʼaɕt/ – we will go → тыкӀощтэп /təkʷʼaɕtap/ – "we will not go".
сэIо /saʔʷa/ "I am saying" → сыIорэп /səʔʷarap/ "I am not saying"
шъушхагъ /ʂʷəʃxaːʁ/ "you (plural) ate" → шъушхагъэп /ʂʷəʃxaːʁap/ "you (plural) didn't ate"
мафэ /maːfa/ – day → мафэп /maːfap/ – it's not a day.
кӀалэ /t͡ʃaːla/ – boy  → кӀалэп /t͡ʃaːlap/ – it's not a boy.
дахэ /daːxa/ – pretty → дахэп /daːxap/ – he/she/it is not pretty.
кӀэхьы /t͡ʃaħə/ – long → кӀэхьэп /t͡ʃaħai/ – he/she/it is not long.

{|
|-
|Ахэр || къэкӏуагъэхэп
|-
|Ахэ-эр || къэ-кӀо-агъ-эх-эп
|-
| || ||
|-
|the those (erg.) || they didn't come
|-
|colspan=2|"they did not come."
|}

{|
|-
|Кӏалэр || иныбджэгъумэ || ядэджэгурэп
|-
| ||  || 
|-
|the boy (arg.) || his friends (erg.) || he doesn't play with them
|-
|colspan=3|"the boy does not play with his friends."
|}

{|
|-
|Непэ || чъыӏэп || фабэ нахь
|-
| ||  || 
|-
|today|| it is not cold || it is actually hot
|-
|colspan=3|"Today is not cold, it is actually hot."
|}

Desirement (~рагъу)
To indicate something desired, the suffix (~рагъу) (~raːʁʷ) is added For example:
сэкӏо /sakʷʼa/ "I am going" → сыкӏорагъу /səkʷʼaraːʁʷ/ "I want to go/.
ушхагъ /wəʃxaːʁ/ "you ate" → ушхарэгъуагъ /wəʃxaraʁʷaːʁ/ "you wanted to eat".
мэплъэт /mapɬat/ "he will look" → мэплъэрэгъот /mapɬaraʁʷat/ "(s)he will want to look".
плъыжьы /pɬəʑə/ – red → плъыжьырагъу /pɬəʑəraːʁʷ/ – (s)he wants to be red.
кӏалэ /t͡ʃʼaːla/ – boy → кӏэлэрагъу /t͡ʃʼalaraːʁʷ/ – (s)he wants to be a boy.
дахэ /daːxa/ – pretty → дэхэрагъу /daxaraːʁʷ/ -(s)he wants to be pretty.
кӏэхьы /t͡ʃʼaħə/ – long → кӏэхьырагъу /t͡ʃʼaħəraːʁʷ/ – (s)he wants to be long.

{|
|-
|кӏалэр || пшъашъэм || иунэ  || мэкӏорагъоп
|-
|кӏалэ-эр || пшъашъэ-эм || и-унэ  || мэ-кӀо-рагъу-эп
|-
| ||  ||  || 
|-
|the boy (abs.) || the girl (erg.) || his house || he don't want to go
|-
|colspan=4|"the boy don't want to go to the girl's house"
|}
{|
|-
|дышъэм || фэдэу || пшъашъэр ||дэхэрагъу
|-
| ||  ||  ||
|-
|the gold (erg.) || like him || the girl (abs.) ||(s)he wants to be pretty
|-
|colspan=4|"the girl wants to be pretty like a gold"
|}
{|
|-
|лxым || фэдэу || сыкӏочӏэрэгъуагъ
|-
| ||  || 
|-
|the man (erg.) || like him || I wanted to be strong
|-
|colspan=3|"I wanted to be strong like the man"
|}

Capability (~шъу)
The suffix ~шъу (~ʃʷə) designates the ability to perform the indicated action. It is used to indicated that the subject is able to carry out the indicated action. For example:

{|
|-
| кӏалэм || шхыныр || фэшхышъурэп
|-
| кӏалэ-м || шхыны-р || фэ-шхы-шъу-рэп
|-
| ||  || 
|-
| boy (erg.)|| the food (abs.) || (s)he does not manages to eat it
|-
|colspan=3|"The boy doesn't manages to eat the food."
|}

{|
|-
|лӏыжъэр || ныбжьыкӏэм || мэкӏошъущтыгъагъ || тэрэзэу
|-
|лӏыжъ-эр || ныбжьыкӏ-эм || мэкӏо-шъу-щт-эгъ || тэрэз-эу
|-
| ||  ||  || 
|-
|old man (abs.)|| when he was young || (s)he was able to go || correctly
|-
|colspan=4|"When the old man was young, he was able to go correctly."
|}

{|
|-
|унэм|| уехьэмэ || псы || къысфэпхьышъущта?
|-
|унэ-эм|| у-ехьэ-эм || псы || къы-с-фэ-п-хьы-шъу-щт-а
|-
| ||  ||  || 
|-
| house (erg.)|| when you enter the house || a water || could you bring it for me?
|-
|colspan=4|"when you enter the house, could you bring me a water?"
|}

When the suffix ~шъу (~ʃʷə) is used on adjectives or nouns, it is to indicate the possibility of what the indicated adjective or noun can be.

мэфэщт /mafaɕt/ – it will be day → мэфэшъущт /mafaʃʷəɕt/ – it could be a day.
лъэжъуагъ /ɬaʒʷaːʁ/ – late → лъэжъогъэшъущтэгъ /ɬaʒʷaʁaʃʷəɕtaʁ/ – it could have been late.
кӏалэ /t͡ʃʼaːɮa/- boy  → кӏэлэшъущт /t͡ʃʼaɮaʃʷəɕt/ – it could be a boy.
дахэ /daːxa/ – pretty → дэхэшъущт /daxaʃʷəɕt/ – it could be beautiful.
кӏэхьы /t͡ʃaħə/ – long → кӏэхьышъущтэгъ /t͡ʃʼaħəʃʷəɕtaʁ/ – it could have been long.

{|
|-
|мы || шхыныри ||ӏэшӏушъущт
|-
|мы || шхыны-ри ||ӏэшӏу-шъу-щт
|-
| ||  || 
|-
| this || the food as well (abs.) || it could be tasty
|-
|colspan=3|"This food also could be tasty."
|}

{|
|-
|иджы || мэфэшъущтыгъагъэба?
|-
|иджы || мэфэ-шъу-щты-гъагъэ-ба
|-
| || 
|-
|  now || couldn't it be a day? 
|-
|colspan=2|"Couldn't it be a day now?"
|}

Concessive mood (~ми)
To indicate an event that will happen even if something/someone does a specific verb, has the Suffix ~ми (~məj).

мэкIуагъ /makʷʼaːʁ/ – he went → мэкIуагъэми /makʷʼaːʁaməj/ – even if he went.
сэкIо /saːkʷʼa/ – I am going → сыкIоми /səkʷʼaməj/ – even if I am going.
тыкIощт /təkʷʼaɕt/ – we will go → тыкIощтми /təkʷʼaɕtməj/ – even if we will go.
мафэ /maːfa/ – day → мафэми /maːfaməj/ – even if it's a day.
кIалэ /t͡ʃʼaːɮa/ – boy  → кIалэми /t͡ʃʼaːɮaməj/ – even if it's a boy.
дахэ /daːxa/ – pretty → дахэми /daːxaməj/ – even if he/she/it is pretty.
кӏэхьы /t͡ʃʼaħə/ – long → кӏэхьыми /t͡ʃʼaħəməj/ – even if he/she/it is long.

{|
|-
|кӏалэм|| епӏуагъэми || къыодэӏущтэп
|-
|кӏалэ-м|| епӏо-агъэ-ми || къы-о-дэӏу-щт-эп
|-
| ||  || 
|-
|the boy (erg.)|| even if you told him || (s)he will not listen to you
|-
|colspan=3|"even if you told the boy he will not listen to you"
|}

{|
|-
|кӏалэр|| мэкӏошъущтыми || нахьышӏу || мамыкӏомэ
|-
|кӏалэ-р|| мэ-кӏо-шъу-щты-ми || нахьышӏу || ма-мы-кӏо-мэ
|-
| ||  ||   || 
|-
|the boy (abs.)|| even if (s)he can go || it is better || if (s)he don't go
|-
|colspan=4|"even if the boy could go it is better if he don't go"
|}

{|
|-
|улажьэми || ахъщэ || къыуатыщтэп
|-
|у-лажьэ-ми || ахъщэ || къы-у-а-ты-щт-эп
|-
| ||  || 
|-
|even if you work || money || they will not give it to you
|-
|colspan=3|"even if you work they will not give you money"
|}

Conditional mood (~мэ)
To indicate a result of a certain verb that if someone/something done, doing or will do, has the Suffix -мэ (-ma).

мэкӏуагъ /makʷʼaːʁ/ – he went → мэкӏуагъэмэ /makʷʼaːʁama/ – if he went.
сэкӏо /sakʷʼa/ – I am going → сыкӏомэ /səkʷʼama/ – if I go.
тыкӏощт /təkʷʼaɕt/ – we will go → тыкӏощтмэ /təkʷʼaɕtma/ – if we will go.
мафэ /maːfa/ – day → мафэмэ /maːfama/ – if it's a day.
кӏалэ /t͡ʃʼaːɮa/ – boy  → кӏалэмэ /t͡ʃʼaːɮama/ – if it's a boy.
дахэ /daːxa/ – pretty → дахэмэ /daːxama/ – if he/she/it is pretty.
кӏэхьы /t͡ʃʼaħə/ – long → кӏэхьымэ /t͡ʃʼaħəma/ – if he/she/it is long.

{|
|-
| кӏалэр || мэлажьэмэ || ахъщэ || къыратыщт
|-
| кӏалэ-р || мэлажьэ-мэ || ахъщэ || къы-р-а-ты-щт
|-
| ||  ||  || 
|-
|the boy (abs.)|| if he work || money  || they will give him
|-
|colspan=4|"if the boy work they will give him money"
|}

{|
|-
| усымаджэу || удэкӏымэ || нахьиу || усымэджэщт
|-
| у-сымаджэ-у || у-дэкӏы-мэ || нахьиу || у-сымэджэ-щт
|-
| ||  ||  || 
|-
| while you are sick || if you go out || even more || you will get sick
|-
|colspan=4|"if you go out while you are sick, you will get even more sick"
|}

{|
|-
| учъэрагъомэ || унэм || икӏи || чъэ
|-
| у-чъэ-рагъо-мэ || унэ-м || икӏый || чъэ
|-
| ||  ||  || 
|-
| if you want to run || the house (erg.) || get out (in order for something to happen) ||  run!
|-
|colspan=4|"if you want to go, get out from the house and go"
|}

Can not be used simultaneously both the suffix -мэ (-ma) and the suffix -ми (-mi).

Conditional Mood II (~кӏэ)
The conditional mood can be indicated by adding the suffix ~кӏэ (~t͡ʃʼ). For example: Натрыфыр зы мафэ-мэфит1у губгъэм еты-к1э, зи щыш1ыщтэп – If the corn will be in the field a day or two, nothing will happen to it.

It is mostly used with the time prefix з~:

{|
| Фылымыр ||  къызыублэкӏэ  || къысаӏу
|-
| Фылымы-р ||  къы-зы-ублэ-кӏэ  || къы-с-аӏу
|-
| ||  ||  
|-
| film (Abs.) || when it starts || tell me
|-
|colspan=3|"tell me when the movie starts."
|}

{|
| Шъхьэнгъупчъэр || къегъас  || къызещхыкӏэ
|-
| Шъхьэнгъупчъэ-р || къегъас  || къы-з-ещхы-кӏэ
|-
| ||  ||  
|-
| windows (Abs.) || close || when it rains
|-
|colspan=3|"close the windows when it rains."
|}

Connective (~и)
When the connective suffix ~и (-əj) is used on present tense verbs, it is to indicate a chain of different verbs that occurred in the past.

макӏо /maːkʷʼa/ – (s)he is going → макӏуи /maːkʷʼəj/ – (s)he went and.
сэкӏо /saʷʼa/ – I am going → сыкӏуи /səkʷʼəj/ – I went and.
еплъы /japɬə/ – s(he) is looking at → еплъи /japɬəj/ – (s)he looked at it and.

{|
|кӏалэр|| макӏуи || унэм || къеплъи || къэкӏожьэгъ
|-
|кӏалэ-р|| макӏу-и || унэ-м || къ-еплъ-и || къэ-кӏо-жь-эгъ
|-
| ||  ||  ||  || 
|-
|the boy (abs.)|| (s)he went and || house (erg.) || (s)he look at it and || (s)he returned
|-
|colspan=5|"the boy went, looked at the house and returned"
|}

{|
|-
|кӏалэр || мэкӏожьи || мые || къэсфихьэгъ
|-
|кӏалэ-р || мэкӏожь-и || мые || къэ-с-ф-ихь-эгъ
|-
| ||  ||  || 
|-
|the boy (abs.)|| (s)he went back and || an apple|| s(he) brought it for me
|-
|colspan=4|"the boy went back and brought me an apple"
|}

When the suffix ~ни (-nəj) is used on present tense verbs, it is to indicate a chain of different verbs that will occur in the future or planned to be done in the future.

макӏо /maːkʷʼa/ – (s)he is going → мэкӏони /makʷʼanəj/ – (s)he will go and.
сэкӏо /saʷʼa/ – I am going → сыкӏони /səkʷʼanəj/ – I will go and.
еплъы /japɬə/ – s(he) is looking at → еплъыни /japɬənəj/ – (s)he will look at it and.

{|
|кӏалэр|| мэкӏони || псы || къэтфихьыщт
|-
|кӏалэ-р|| мэкӏо-ни || псы || къэ-т-ф-ихьы-щт
|-
| ||  ||  || 
|-
|the boy (abs.)|| (s)he will go and || water || (s)he will bring us it
|-
|colspan=4|"the boy will go and will bring us water."
|}

{|
|-
|уиунэ || сыкъэкӏони || тызэдеджэщт
|-
|уи-унэ || сы-къэ-кӏо-ни || ты-зэ-де-джэ-щт
|-
| ||  || 
|-
| you house|| I will come and  || we will study together
|-
|colspan=3|"I will come to your house and we gonna study together."
|}

{|
|-
|мары, || зысгъэпсыкӏыни || сыкъыдэкӏыщт
|-
|мары, || зы-с-гъэ-псыкӏы-ни || сы-къы-дэкӏы-щт
|-
| ||  || 
|-
| just a moment || I gonna take a shower and || I gonna come out
|-
|colspan=3|"A moment, I gonna take a shower and gonna come out."
|}

When the connective suffix ~и (-əj) is used in imperative mood, it is to indicate a chain of different verbs that the listener(s) should do at that moment.

кӏон /kʷʼan/ – to go → кӏуи /makʷʼanəj/ – go and.
еплъын /japɬən/ – to look at → еплъи /japɬəj/ – look at it and.
шъушхын /ʃʷəʃxən/ – (you plural) to eat → шъушхи /ʃʷəʃxən/ – you (plural) eat and.

{|
|-
|кӏуи || кӏалэр || улъэгъущт
|-
|кӏо-и || кӏалэ-р || у-лъэгъу-щт
|-
| ||  
|-
|go and || the boy (abs.) || you will see it
|-
|colspan=3|"go and you will see the boy"
|}

{|
|-
| лажьи || ахъщэ || къыуатыщт
|-
| лажь-и || ахъщэ || къы-у-а-ты-щт
|-
| ||  || 
|-
|work (in order for the event to occur) || money || they will give you money
|-
|colspan=3|"work and they will give you money"
|}

When the suffix ~и (-əj) is added to past and future tense verbs, nouns and adjectives, it is to indicate the cause of a certain event.

мэкӏуагъ /makʷʼaːʁ/ – (s)he went → мэкӏуагъи /makʷʼaːʁəj/ – because (s)he went.
сыкӏошт /səkʷʼaɕt/ – I will go → сыкӏошти /səkʷʼaɕtəj/ – because I will go.
мафэ /maːfa/ – day → мафи /maːfəj/ – because it is a day.
кӏалэ /t͡ʃʼaːɮa/ – boy  → кӏали /t͡ʃʼaːɮəj/ – because he is a boy.
дахэ /daːxa/ – pretty → дахи /daːxəj/ – because s(he) is pretty.
кӏэхьы /t͡ʃʼaħə/ – long → кӏэхьи /t͡ʃʼaħəj/ – because s(he) is long.

{|
|-
| улэжьагъи || ахъщэ || къыуатэгъ
|-
| у-лэжь-агъ-и || ахъщэ || къыу-а-тэ-гъ
|-
| ||  || 
|-
|because you worked || money || they gave you it
|-
|colspan=3|"because you worked, they gave you money"
|}

{|
|-
| уцӏапӏи || ӏаеу|| къыпдэзакӏох
|-
| у-цӏапӏ-и || ӏае-у|| къып-дэзакӏо-х
|-
| ||  || 
|-
|because are mean || in a bad way || they are treating you like it
|-
|colspan=3|"because you are mean, they are treating you bad"
|}

{|
|кӏалэр|| мэкӏощтгъагъи || цуакъэхэр || щилъагъэх
|-
|кӏалэ-р|| мэкӏо-щт-гъагъ-и || цуакъэ-хэ-р || щылъ-агъ-эх
|-
| ||  ||  || 
|-
|the boy (abs.)|| because (s)he was going to go || the shoes (abs.) || (s)he wear them
|-
|colspan=4|"because the boy was going to go, he wore the shes on."
|}

{|
|-
|пшъашъэр || дахи || кӏалэхэр || къеплъых
|-
|пшъашъэ-р || дахэ-и || кӏалэ-хэ-р || къе-плъы-х
|-
| ||  ||  || 
|-
|the girl (abs.)|| because he/she is pretty || the boys (abs.)|| they are looking at it
|-
|colspan=4|"because the girl is pretty, the boys are looking at her"
|}

Until (~фэ)
To indicate an event that will happen until the verb is done, the verbal suffix ~фэ /~fa/ is added. For example:

 сэкӏо /sakʷʼa/ I am going → сыкӏофэ /səkʷʼafa/ until I am going
 сэкIуагъ /sakʷʼaːʁ/ I was going → сыкIуагъэфэ /səkʷʼaːʁafa/ until I was going
 тэлажьэ /talaːʑa/ we are working → тылажьэфэ /talaːʑafa/ until we were working
 мэшхэ /maʃxa/ he is eating → мэшхэфэ /maʃxafa/ until he was eating

The suffix ~нэс /~nas/ can also be used for the same meaning :

 сэкӏо /sakʷʼa/ I am going → сыкӏонэс /səkʷʼanas/ until I am going
 сэкIуагъ /sakʷʼaːʁ/ I was going → сыкIуагъэнэс /səkʷʼaːʁanas/ until I was going
 тэлажьэ /talaːʑa/ we are working → тылажьэнэс /talaːʑanas/ until we were working
 мэшхэ /maʃxa/ he is eating → мэшхэнэс /maʃxanas/ until he was eating
кӏалэ /t͡ʃʼaːɮa/ – boy → кӏалэнэс /t͡ʃʼaːɮanas/ – until it is a boy
мафэ /maːfa/ – day → мафэнэс /maːfanas/ – until it is a day
фабэ /faːba/ – hot → фабэнэс /faːbanas/ – until it is hot
шӏуцӏэ /ʃʷət͡sʼa/ – black → шӏуцӏэнэс /ʃʷət͡sʼanas/ – until it is black
сыкӏуачӏэ /səkʷʼaːt͡ʃʼa/ – I am strong → сыкӏуачӏэнэс /səkʷʼaːt͡ʃʼanas/ – until I am strong
чэщы /t͡ʃaɕə/ – night → чэщынэс /t͡ʃaɕənas/ – until it's night.

{|
|-
| кӏалэр || мэкӏофэ || паплъ
|-
| кӏалэ-р || мэкӏо-фэ || паплъ
|-
| ||  || 
|-
| the boy (abs.) || until (s)he goes || wait
|-
|colspan=3|"wait until the boy goes"
|}

{|
|-
| кӏалэр || къэсыфэ || зыб || ригъэхьыра?
|-
| кӏалэ-р || къэсы-фэ || зыб || ригъэхьыра?
|-
| ||  ||  || 
|-
| boy (abs.) || until (s)he arrive || so much || he is taking (time)
|-
|colspan=4|"it's taking so much time until the boy arrives"
|}

{|
|-
| чэщынэс || лажьэгу
|-
| чэщы-нэс || лажьэ-гу
|-
| || 
|-
| until it is night || work for now
|-
|colspan=2|"work until it is night"
|}

Downward (~хы)
The verbal suffix ~хы /~xə/ designates action performed downwards or action performed towards a lower level :
 ехы /jaxə/ – to go down
 ефэхы /jafaxə/ – to fall down
 чъэн /t͡ʂan/ – to run → ечъэхын /jat͡ʂaxən/ – to run down
 плъэн /pɬan/ – to look → еплъэхын /japɬaxən/ – to look down
 пкӏэн /pt͡ʃʼan/ – to jump → епкӏэхын /japt͡ʃʼaxən/ – to jump down to
 итӏэрэн /jətʼaran/ – to fall into → етӏэрэхын /jatʼaraxən/ – to fall down into
 джыджэн /d͡ʒəd͡ʒan/ – to roll → еджыджэхын /jad͡ʒəd͡ʒaxən/ – to roll down 
 еон /jawan/ – to hit → еохын /jawaxən/ – to strike down; to be shut downed
 дзын /d͡zən/ – to throw → едзыхын /jad͡zəxən/ – to fall down
 тӏысын /tʼəsən/ – to sit → етӏысыхын /jatʼəsəxən/ – to land

{|
|-
| кӏалэр || унэм || еплъэхы
|-
| кӏалэ-р || ун-эм || еплъэ-хы
|-
| ||  || 
|-
| the boy (abs.) || house (erg.) || (s)he is looking down
|-
|colspan=3|"The boy is looking down from the house."
|}

{|
|-
| бзыор || уашъом || къедзыхы
|-
| бзыу-р || уашъо=м || къ-едзы-хы
|-
| ||  || 
|-
| the bird (abs.) || sky (erg.) || it is falling
|- 
|colspan=3|"The bird is falling down from the sky."
|}

{|
|-
| унашъхьэм || укъемыпкӏэх
|-
| унашъхьэ-м || у-къ-е-мы-пкӏэ-х
|-
| || 
|-
| roof (erg.) || don't jump down
|- 
|colspan=2|"Don't jump down from the roof."
|}

Upward (~е)
To designate action in an upward direction, the prefix д~ (d~) and the verbal suffix ~е (ja) are added.
 кӏон: to go → дэкӏоен: to go upwards.
 гъэкӏон: to make someone go → дэгъэкӏоен: to make someone go upwards; to rise a value.
 чъэн: to run → дэчъэен: to run upwards.
 ӏэтын : to raise → дэӏэтэен: to raise.
 цӏэлъэн : to crawl → дэцӏэлъэен: to climb.
 пкӏэн: to jump → дэпкӏэен: to hop upwards.
 лъэшъун: to drag someone → дэлъэшъоен: to drag someone upwards.
 быбын : to fly → дэбэбыен: to fly upwards to; to take off; to whirl to.
 плъэн : to look → деплъыен : to look upwards.
 хьын : to carry → дехьыен : to carry upwards.

{|
|-
| волюмэр || дэгъэкӏуай
|-
| волюмэ-р || дэ-гъэ-кӏу-ай
|-
| || 
|-
| volume (abs.)  || raise
|-
|colspan=2|"Raise the volume."
|}

{|
|-
| кӏалэр || унашъхьэм || дэкӏуае
|-
| кӏалэ-р || унашъхьэ-м  || дэ-кӏуа-е
|-
| ||  || 
|-
| the boy (abs.) || house roof (erg.) || (s)he is going upwards
|-
|colspan=3|"The boy is going up to the roof."
|}

For a while (~гу)
The suffix ~гу (~ɡʷ) designates that the indicated action was performed for a period of time. It might be used to indicated that the action will be performed quickly. For example:
 сэкӏо /sakʷʼa/ I am going → сэкӏого /sakʷʼaɡʷa/ I am going for now.
 сэкӏуагъ /sakʷʼaːʁ/ I was going → сыкӏуагъэгу /səkʷʼaːʁaɡʷ/ I went for a while.
 тэлажьэ /taɮaːʑa/ we are working → тэлажьэго /taɮaːʑaɡʷa/ we are working for now.
 машхэ /maːʃxa/ he is eating → машхэго /maːʃxaɡʷa/ he was eating for now.

This also can be add to noun and adjective :
кӏалэ /t͡ʃʼaːɮa/ – boy (kʷʼa) → кӏалэгу /t͡ʃʼaːɮaɡʷ/ – it is a boy for now
мафэ /maːfa/ – day → мафэгу /maːfaɡʷ/ – it is day for now
фабэ /faːba/ – hot → фабэгу /faːbaɡʷ/ – it is hot for now
дахэ /daːxa/ – pretty → дахэгу /daːxaɡʷ/ – (s)he is pretty for now
дэхагъ /daxaːʁ/ -(s)he was pretty → дэхагъэгу /daxaɡʷ/ – (s)he was pretty for a while
дэхэщт /daːxaɕt/ -(s)he will be pretty → дэхэщтыгу /daxaɕtəɡʷ/ – (s)he will be pretty for a while

{|
|-
| кӏалэр || тучанэм || мэкӏуагъэгу
|-
| кӏалэ-р || тучанэ-м || мэкӏо-агъэгу
|-
| ||   || 
|-
| the boy (abs.) || the shop (erg.) || he went for a while
|-
|colspan=3|"the boy went to the shop for now"
|}

{|
|-
| Томыр || еджэгуи, || къэтдэджэгушъущтыгоп
|-
| Том-ыр || еджэ-гу-и,|| къэ-т-дэ-джэгу-шъу-щты-го-п
|-
| ||  || 
|-
| Tom (abs.) || because (s)he is studying for now || (s)he can't play with us for now
|-
|colspan=3|"Because Tom is studying for now, he can't play with us for now"
|}

{|
|-
|паркэм || къэсыкӏохьыщтыгу ||
|-
|паркэ-м || къэ-сы-кӏохьы-щтыгу ||
|-
| || 
|-
| in the park (erg.) || I will go around for a while
|-
|colspan=2|"I will go around for a while in the park."
|}

{|
|-
|джэгуалъэм || сыриджэгурагъогу ||
|-
|джэгуалъэ-м || сы-риджэгу-рагъо-гу ||
|-
| || 
|-
| the toy (erg.) || I want to play it for now
|-
|colspan=2|"I wanna play the toy for now"
|}

Optative mood (~гъэет)
The verbal suffix ~гъэет (~ʁajat) or ~гъагъэет (~ʁaːʁjat) or designates optative mood.

 мэкӏуагъ /makʷaːʁ/ – (s)he went → мэкӏуагъэет /makʷʼaːʁajat/ – I wish (s)he would have gone.
 мэчъэгъагъ /mat͡ʂaʁaːʁ/ (s)he was running → мэчъэгъагъет /mat͡ʂaʁaːʁajat/ I wish (s)he would have run,
 сыплъагъ /səpɬaːʁ/ I looked at → сыплъагъэет /səpɬaːʁajat/ I wish I would have looked.
 даха /daːxa/ pretty → дэхэгъагъэет /daxaʁaːʁajat/ I wish I would have pretty.
 сыкӏочӏэ /səkʷʼaːt͡ʂʼa/ I am strong → сыкӏочӏэгъагъэет /səkʷʼat͡ʂʼaʁaːʁajat/ I wish I had been strong.

{|
|-
| ӏэгуаор || футболы джэгумкӏэ || къэсфэптыгъагъэет
|-
| ӏэгуао-р || футболы  джэгу-мкӏэ || къэ-с-фэ-п-ты-гъагъэ-ет
|-
| ||  || 
|-
| ball (abs.) || soccer game (ins.) || I wish you would have passed me it
|-
|colspan=3|"I wish you would have passed me the ball in the soccer game."
|}

{|
|-
| сэ || сынахь  || кӏочӏэгъагъэет || ӏанэр || къэсыштэшъунэу
|-
| сэ || сы-нахь  || кӏочӏэ-гъагъэ-ет || ӏанэ-р || къэ-сы-штэ-шъу-нэу
|-
| ||  ||  ||  || 
|-
| I || (I) more || I wish I had been strong || table (abs.) || for me to lift it
|-
|colspan=5|"I wish I had been more stronger to lift the table."
|}

{|
|-
| нахь || пасэу || сыкъэкӏогъагъэет
|-
| нахь || пасэ-у || сы-къэ-кӏо-гъагъэ-ет
|-
| ||  || 
|-
| more || early || I wish I had come
|-
|colspan=3|"I wish I had come earlier."
|}

Diminution of degree (~рашъу)
To indicate a diminution of degree ("kind of"), the suffix ~рашъу (~raːʃʷ) is added. It is mostly used on verbs and adjectives and are rarely used on noun.

макӏо /maːkʷʼa/ – (s)he is going → мэкӏорашъу /makʷʼaraːʃʷ/ – (s)he kind of going
мапкӏэ /maːpt͡ʃʼa/ – (s)he is jumping → мэпкӏэрашъу /mapt͡ʃʼaraːʃʷ/ -(s)he kind of jumping.
фабэ /faːba/ – hot → фэбэрашъу /fabaraːʃʷ/ – is it kind of hot.
кӏуачӏэ /kʷʼaːt͡ʃʼa/ – strong → кӏочӏэрашъу /kʷʼat͡ʃʼaraːʃʷ/ – (s)he is kind of strong

{|
|-
|а ||лӏыжъыр || делэрашъу
|-
|а ||лӏыжъы-р || делэ-рашъу
|-
| ||  || 
|-
|that|| old man (abs.) ||  (s)he is kind of stupid
|-
|colspan=3|"The old man is kind of stupid."
|}

Surprise mood (~уи)
The suffix -уи (-wəːj) indicates a surprise mood.  
кӏалэ /t͡ʃʼaːɮa/ – boy → кӏалэуи /t͡ʃʼaːɮawəj/ – is it really a boy?
мафэ /maːfa/ – day → мафэуи /maːfawəːj/ – is it really a day?
фабэ /faːba/ – hot → фабэуи /faːbawəːj/ – is it really hot?
кӏуачӏэ /kʷʼaːt͡ʃʼa/ – strong → кӏуачӏэуи /kʷʼaːt͡ʃʼawəːj/ – is (s)he is really strong?
мэкӏошъу /makʷʼaʃʷə/ – (s)he is capable of going → мэкӏошъууи /makʷʼaʃʷəwəːj/ – is (s)he really capable of going?
усмэджагъ /wəsmad͡ʒaːʁ/ – you got sick → усмэджагъуи /wəsmad͡ʒaːʁwəj/ – you to become sick?

{|
|-
| мы || унэр || зишӏыгъэр || шъузуи?
|-
| ||   ||   || 
|-
| this || house (abs.) || the one who made it|| is a woman?
|-
|colspan=4|"The one who made this house is a woman (surprised)?"
|}

{|
|-
| кӏалэм || еуагъэр || сэруи?
|-
| ||   || 
|-
| the boy (erg.) || the one (s)he hit || me?
|-
|colspan=3|"The one who hit the boy is me (surprised)?"
|}

{|
|-
|а ||кӏалэ || кӏакор || кӏуачӏэуи?
|-
| ||  || || 
|-
|that|| boy || the short one (abs.) || is (s)he really strong?
|-
|colspan=4|"That short boy is strong (surprised)?"
|}

After the action connection (~эм)
To indicate an event that happened in the past after a certain verb was done, the suffix -эм (-am) is added.

сэкӏо /sakʷʼa/ – I am going → сэкӏом /sakʷʼam/ – when I went.
тэшхэ /taʃxa/ – we are eating → тэшхэм /taʃxam/ – when we ate.
еплъых /japɬəx/ – they are looking at it → еплъыхэм /japɬəxam/ – when they looked at it.
шъолажьэ /ʃʷaɮaːʑa/ – you (plural) are working → шъолажьэм /ʃʷaɮaːʑam/ – when you (plural) worked

{|
|-
|сэкӏом|| сишы || къэслъэгъогъ
|-
|сэкӏо-м|| си-шы || къэ-с-лъэгъу-эгъ
|-
| ||  ||
|-
|when i went|| my brother || i saw
|-
|colspan=3|"when I went I saw my brother."
|}

{|
|-
|пшъашъэр|| унэм || ехьэм || янэ || ӏукӏагъ
|-
|пшъашъэ-р|| унэ-м || ехьэ-м || янэ || ӏукӏ-агъ
|-
| || ||  || || 
|-
|the girl (abs.)|| the house (erg.) || when (s)he entered it || his/her mother || (s)he met him/her
|-
|colspan=5|"when the girl entered the house she met her mother."
|}

{|
|-
|лӏым|| едж || къысеӏом|| седжагъ
|-
|лӏы-м|| едж || къы-с-еӏо-м|| с-еджэ-агъ
|-
| ||  || ||
|-
| man (erg.) || study! || when (s)he told me || I studied
|-
|colspan=4|"when the man told me to study, I studied."
|}

To indicate an event that is happening after a certain verb is done with no indication to the time it happened, the time prefix з~ and the suffix ~рэм (~ram) are added.

сэкӏо /sakʷʼa/ – I am going → сызкӏорэм /səzkʷʼaram/ – whenever I go.
тэшхэ /taʃxa/ – we are eating → тызшхэрэм /təzʃxam/ – whenever we eat.
еплъых /japɬəx/ – they are looking at it → зеплъыхэрэм /zajpɬəxaram/ – whenever they look at it.
шъолажьэ /ʃʷaɮaːʑa/ – you (plural) are working → шъузлажьэрэм /ʃʷəzɮaːʑaram/ – whenever you (plural) work

{|
|-
| сэ || сызышхэрэм || сиӏэхэр || сэтхьакӏыжьых
|-
| сэ || сы-зы-шхэ-рэм || си-ӏэ-хэ-р || сэ-тхьакӏы-жьы-х
|-
| ||  || ||
|-
| I || whenever I eat || my hands (abs.) || I am washing them afterward
|-
|colspan=4|"Whenever I eat, I wash my hands afterward."
|}

{|
|-
| унэм || чэщым ||узкъихьэжьырэм || пчъэр || къегъэтэу шӏы
|-
| унэ-м || чэщы-м|| у-з-къ-и-хьэ-жьы-рэм ||  пчъэ-р || къ-егъэтэ-у шӏы
|-
| ||  ||  ||  ||
|-
| house (erg.) || at the night || whenever you enter it || door (abs.) || be used to lock it
|-
|colspan=5|"Whenever you enter the house at night, lock the door."
|}

{|
|-
| чылэм ||сыздэкӏырэм || ахъщэ || сэӏыгъэ
|-
| чылэ-м ||сы-з-дэ-кӏы-рэм || ахъщэ || сэ-ӏыгъэ
|-
| ||  ||  ||
|-
| village (erg.) || whenever I go out || money || I am holding it
|-
|colspan=4|"Whenever I go out of the village, I hold money."
|}

To indicate an event that happened right before a certain verb was going to be done, the suffix ~ным (~nəm) is added.

сэкӏо /sakʷʼa/ – I am going → сыкӏоным /səkʷʼaram/ – the moment I was about to go.
тэшхэ /taʃxa/ – we are eating → тышхэным /təʃxam/ – the moment we were about to eat.
еплъых /japɬəx/ – they are looking at it → еплъыхэным /japɬəxaram/ – the moment they were about to look at.
шъолажьэ /ʃʷaɮaːʑa/ – you (plural) are working → шъулажьэным /ʃʷəɮaːʑaram/ – the moment you (plural) were about to work.

{|
|-
| сомпыютэрымкӏэ || къесхэхь горэ|| къиухыным || сомпыютэрыр || къэсшӏокӏосагъ
|-
| сомпыютэр-ымкӏэ || къе-с-хэхь горэ|| къ-иухы-ным || сомпыютэр-ыр || къэ-с-шӏо-кӏос-агъ
|-
| ||  ||   || || 
|-
| in the computer (ins.) || something I download || the moment it was going to finish || computer (abs.) || it turned off against my interest 
|-
|colspan=6|"The moment something I download in the computer was about to finish, the computer turned off."
|}

{|
|-
| сызышхэным || сиукъэкӏыжьэгъ || сиӏэхэр || сытхьакӏынэу
|-
| сы-зы-шхэ-ным || с-и-укъэкӏыжь-эгъ || си-ӏэ-хэ-р || сы-тхьакӏы-нэу
|-
|  ||  ||  || 
|-
| at the time I was about to eat || I remembered || my hands (abs.) || I (to) wash them
|-
|colspan=4|"When I was about to eat, I remembered to wash my hands. "
|}

Recurrence (~расэ)
The verbal suffix ~рас (-raːs) designates recurrence, presence of a characteristic. It designates an action that someone often does. For example:

 макӏо /maːkʷʼa/ (s)he is going → мэкӏорас /makʷʼaraːs/ (s)he usually/often goes.
 еплъы /japɬə/ (s)he is looking at → еплъырас /japɬəraːs/ (s)he usually/often looks at
 ео /jawa/ (s)he is hitting it → еорас /jawaraːs/ (s)he usually/often hits it

{|
| сэ || лимон|| сышхырасэрэп 
|-
| сэ || лимон || сы-шхы-расэ-рэп 
|-
| ||  ||  
|-
| I || a lemon || I don't eat it often|-
|colspan=3|"I don't eat lemon often."
|-
|colspan=3|"I don't usually eat lemon."
|}

{|
| кӏалэр || къэлэм плъыжьым || ритхэрас|-
| кӏалэ-р || къэлэм плъыжьы-м || ри-тхэ-рас|-
| ||  ||  
|-
| the boy (abs.) || red pebcil (erg.) || he often writes with|-
|colspan=3|"The boy often writes with the red pencil."
|}

To indicate the subject or the object that usually or often do a certain verb, the suffix ~расэ (-raːsa) is added to the noun that was created from a verb. for example:

 макӏорэ /maːkʷʼara/ the one that is going → мэкӏорасэрэ /maːkʷʼaraːsa/ the one that is usually/often goes.
 зыдакӏорэ /zədaːkʷʼara/ the place (s)he is going → зыдэкӏорасэрэ /zədakʷʼaraːsa/ the place (s)he usually/often goes.
 еплъырэ /japɬəra/ the one that is looking at → еплъырасэрэ /japɬəraːsa/ the one that usually/often looks at
 зеплъырэ /zajpɬəra/ the one (s)he is looking at → зеплъырасэрэ /zajpɬəraːsa/ the one (s)he usually/often looks at
 ылъэгъурэ /jəɬaʁʷəra/ the one (s)he is seeing → ылъэгъурасэрэ /jəɬaʁʷəraːsa/ the one (s)he usually/often sees.
 зилъэгъурэ /zəjɬaʁʷəra/ the one that sees it → зилъэгъурасэрэ /zəjɬaʁʷəraːsa/ the one that usually/often sees it.

{|
|непчыхьэ || тызкӏорасэрэм || тышъугъакӏу
|-
|не-пчыхьэ || ты-з-кӏо-расэ-рэ-м || ты-шъу-гъа-кӏу
|-
| ||  || 
|-
| tonight || the place we often go (erg.) || let/allow us to go (said to plural)
|-
|colspan=3|"Let us go to the place we usually goes to."
|}

{|
| кӏалэм || шоколадэхэр || ышхырэсэгъагъэх || бэрэ
|-
| кӏалэ-м || шоколад-эх-эр|| ы-шхы-рэс-гъагъэ-эх || бэрэ
|-
| ||  ||  ||  
|-
| the boy (erg.) || chocolates (abs.) || he used to eat them often || a lot
|-
|colspan=4|"The boy used to eat chocolates a lot"
|}

{|
| сэ || къэлэмэу || сызритхэрасэр || плъыжьы
|-
| сэ || къэлэм-эу || сы-з-ри-тхэ-расэ-р  || плъыжьы
|-
| ||  ||  ||  
|-
| I || pencil (adv.) || the thing I often writes with (abs.) || red
|-
|colspan=4|"The pencil I usually writes with is red."
|}

About to (~пэт)
To indicate a verb that is about to happened, the verbal suffix -пэт (-pat) is added.

{|
|сыкъаубытыпэтэгъ || кӏалэхэмэ
|-
|сы-къа-убыты-пэтэгъ || кӏалэхэмэ
|-
| || 
|-
| they almost caught me || the boys (erg.)
|-
|colspan=2|"The boys almost caught me."
|}

{|
| псым || уицуакъэкӏэ || ухауцопэтэгъ|-
| псы-м || уи-цуакъэ-кӏэ || у-ха-уцо-пэтэгъ|-
| ||  ||  
|-
| water (erg.) || using your shoes (ins.) || you almost stepped into it|-
|colspan=3|"You almost stepped into the water with your shoes."
|}

{|
| сэ || себэджыпэтыгъэп|-
| сэ || се-бэджы-пэтыгъ-эп|-
| || 
|-
| I || I didn't almost fell on the ground|-
|colspan=2|"I didn't almost fell on the ground."
|}

Always (~зэпыт)
To indicate that the verb is always happen, the suffix -зэпыт (-zapət) is added.

{|
|тучаным || тышъугъэкӏозэпытыщта?|-
|тучан-ым || ты-шъу-гъэ-кӏо-зэпыт-ыщт-а?|-
| || 
|-
| shop (erg.) || are you (pl.) gonna make us go always|-
|colspan=2|"Are you (plural) gonna make us go to the shop all the time?."
|}

{|
| кӏалэм || мые || ышхызэпытэгъ 
|-
| кӏалэ-м || мые || ышхы-зэпыт-эгъ 
|-
| ||  ||  
|-
| boy (erg.) || an apple || (s)he used to eat it always|-
|colspan=3|"The boy used to eat apple all the time."
|}

{|
| сэ|| сэчъэзэпыт || щэджэгъожьым
|-
| сэ|| сэ-чъэ-зэпыт || щэджэгъожьы-м
|-
| ||  ||  
|-
| I || I am always running || at the after noon (ins.)
|-
|colspan=3|"I am always running after noon."
|}

Just recently (~гъакӏ)
To indicate a verb that happened just recently, the suffix -гъакӏ (-ʁaːt͡ʃʼ) is added.

мэкӏуагъ /makʷʼaːʁ/ – he went → мэкӏогъакӏ /makʷʼaːʁaːt͡ʃʼ/ – I just went recently.
сышхагъ /səʃχaːʁ/ – I ate → сышхэгъакӏ /səʃxaʁaːt͡ʃʼ/ – I just ate recently.

{|
|-
| ушхэгъакӏ || нэӏэ || ушхэжьырагъуа?
|-
| у-шхэ-гъакӏ || нэӏэ || у-шхэ-жьы-рагъу-а?
|-
| ||  || 
|-
| you just ate recently || only || do you want to eat again
|-
|colspan=3|"You just ate recently, you wanna eat again?"
|}

{|
|-
| класым || иджы || скъихьэгъакӏ|-
| класы-м || иджы || с-къи-хьэ-гъакӏ|-
| ||  || 
|-
| class (erg.) || now  || I just came in|-
|colspan=3|"I just came into the class right now."
|}

{|
|-
| класым || тыгъуасэ || сихьэгъэкӏэгъагъ || тестэр || къызеублэм
|-
| класы-м || тыгъуасэ || си-хьэ-гъэкӏэ-гъагъ || тестэ-р || къы-зе-ублэ-м
|-
| ||  ||  ||  || 
|-
| class (erg.) || yesterday || I just entered recently (in the past) || test (arg.) || the time it started
|-
|colspan=5|"Yesterday after recently entering the class the test began."
|}

Should have (~пхъагъ)
To indicate a verb that the subject should have done in the past and haven't, the suffix -пхъагъ (-pχaːʁ) is added.

мэкӏуагъ /makʷʼaːʁ/ – (s)he went → мэкӀопхъагъ /makʷʼapχaːʁ/ – (s)he should have gone so.
сыкӏуагъ /səːkʷʼaːʁ/ – I went → сыкӏопхъагъ /səkʷʼapχaːʁ/ – I should have gone so.
тышхагъ /təʃxaːʁ/ – we ate → тышхэпхъагъ  /təʃxapχaːʁ/ – we should have eaten.
уӏуагъ /wʔʷaːʁ/ – you said → уӏопхъагъ  /wʔʷapχaːʁ/ – you should have said so.
къэпхьэгъ /qapħaʁ/ – you brought → къэпхьыпхъагъ /qapħəpχaːʁ/ – you should have brought.

{|
|сиунэ || укъакӏом || сидиск || къэпхьыпхъагъ|-
|си-унэ || у-къа-кӏо-эм || си-диск || къэ-п-хьы-пхъагъ|-
| ||  ||   || 
|-
| my house || when you came || my disk || you should have brought it.
|-
|colspan=4|"When you came to my house, you should have brought my disk with you"
|}

{|
|-
| къэпӏопхъагъ || зэрэуимыӏэ || гущыӏалъэ
|-
| къэ-п-ӏо-пхъагъ || зэрэ-уи-мы-ӏэ || гущыӏалъэ
|-
| ||  || 
|-
| you should have said so || that you don't have it || a dictionary
|-
|colspan=3|"You should have said that you don't have a dictionary."
|}

Area (~хь)
The verbal suffix ~хь /~ħ/ designates action performed on an area or repetition of the action in a certain area :

The reflexive verbal prefix зе~ (zaj~) and the verbal suffix ~хь(~ħ) are used together to indicate action performed by someone around the area or location they are standing in. It also designates repetition of the action around someone. for example:
 чъэн /t͡ʂan/ – to run → зичъэхьын /zəjt͡ʂaħən/ – to run around; to run in circles; to run repetitively.
 кӏон /kʷʼan/ – to go → зикӏохьын /zəjkʷʼaħən/ – to walk around; to walk in circles; to walk repetitively.
 плъэн /pɬan/ – to look → зиплъэхьын /zəjpɬaħən/ – to look around; to observe around; to look repetitively.
 он /wan/ – to hit → зиохьын /zəjwaħən/ – to strike around oneself. 
 шъутырэн /ʃʷətəran/ – to kick → зишъутырэхьын /zəjʃʷətəraħən/ – to kick around oneself.
 зиукӏэхьын /zəjwt͡ʃʼaħən/ – to extend and stretch arms.

{|
|-
| кӏэлэцӏыкӏум || зичъэхьыжьэу || унэм || ит
|-
| кӏэлэцӏыкӏу-м || зи-чъэ-хьы-жьэ-у || унэ-м || ит
|-
| ||  ||  ||
|-
| little boy (erg.) || while running around || house (erg.) || (s)he is standing inside
|-
|colspan=4|"The little boy is running around in the house."
|-
|colspan=4|"Literary meaning : The little boy is in the house while running around.."
|}

{|
|-
| сэ || чъыгым || спысэу || зэсэплъэхьы|-
| сэ || чъыгы-м || с-пы-сэ-у ||  зэ-сэ-плъэ-хьы|-
| ||  ||  ||
|-
| I || tree (erg.) || while sitting on a tree ||I am looking around|-
|colspan=4|"I am looking around while sitting on a tree."
|}

{|
|-
| гъогум || кӏалэм|| зеплъэхьи || тет
|-
| гъогу-м || кӏалэ-м|| зеплъэхьи || тет
|-
| ||  ||  || 
|-
| road (erg.) || boy (erg.) || (s)he is looking around || (s)he stands
|- 
|colspan=4|"the boy is standing on the road looking around."
|}

The verbal prefix къе~ (qaj~) and the verbal suffix ~хь(~ħ) are used together to indicate action performed on an area, for example:
 чъэн /t͡ʂan/ – to run → къэчъэхьын /qat͡ʂaħən/ – to run around it
 кӏон /kʷʼan/ – to go → къэкӏохьын /qakʷʼaħən/ – to go/walk around it
 плъэн /pɬan/ – to look → къэплъэхьын /qapɬaħən/ – to look around it; to scout

{|
|-
| сэ || чылэр || къэскӏохьышт|-
| сэ || чылэ-р || къэ-с-кӏо-хьы-шт|-
| ||  || 
|-
| I || the village (abs.) || I will walk around|-
|colspan=3|"I will walk around the village."
|}

{|
|-
| мэзым || хахьи|| къэплъэхь|-
| мэзы-м || ха-хь-и|| къэ-плъэ-хь|-
| ||  || 
|-
| forest (erg.)|| enter it and || look around it|-
|colspan=3|"Enter the forest and scout around."
|}

To indicate movement round an object, the prefix дэ~ (da~) and the suffix ~хь (~ħ) are added :
 ӏуашъхьэр къыдэкӏохьын: to walk/go around the hill.
 чъыгыр къыдэкӏохьын: to walk/go around the tree.
 унэр къыдэчъэхьын: to run around the house.
 ӏуашъхьэм къыдрикӏохьын: to walk/go around the hill.
 чъыгым къыдрикӏохьын: to walk/go around the tree.

{|
|-
| ӏуашъхьэм || учӏымыкӏыэу || къыдэкӏохь|-
| ӏуашъхьэ-м || у-чӏы-мы-кӏ-эу ||  къы-дэ-кӏо-хь|-
| ||  || 
|-
| hill (erg.)|| while you are not going up it || go around it|-
|colspan=3|"Instead of going up the hill, go around it."
|}

The suffix ~хь (~ħə) can also be used together with the positional prefixes to indicate action performed on a definite area in a certain direction and position. for example:

 мэджыджэн /mad͡ʒəd͡ʒan/ to roll → теджыджэхьын /tajd͡ʒəd͡ʒaħən/ to roll on.
 теуцӏэлэн /tajwt͡sʼaɮan/ – to paint on → теуцӏэлэхьын /tajwt͡sʼaɮaħən/ – to scribble on.
 теӏэбэн /tajʔaban/ – to touch with fingers → теӏэбэхьын /tajʔabaħən/ – to touch something with fingers rapidly.
 мэстын – to burn → хэстыхьан – to burn in an area with some mass (like fire or lava).
 мэукӏын – to be killed → хэукӏэхьан to die in an area with some mass (like a liquid or gas); to die in a war.

{|
|-
| унэ чӏэгъым || чӏаукӏэхьагъ|-
| унэ чӏэгъы-м || чӏ-а-укӏэ-хь-агъ|-
| || 
|-
| under the house (erg.) || they killed him under 
|- 
|colspan=2|"they kill him under the house."
|}

The verbal suffix ~хь(~ħ) can also be used to indicate action performed repetitively or action performed for a long extend or action performed nonstop (without interruption or break) or action performed entirely, for example:
 пыохьын : to entirely beat up someone; to beat someone nonstop
 теохьын : to entirely be hit by an explosion
 хэон: to hit someone hard → хэохьын: to hit someone hard repetitively
 тегущыӏэн: to speak about someone → тегущыӏэхьын: to discuss or talk about someone
 пыплъэн : to look on something → пыплъэхьын : to search on someone entirely
 теплъэн : to look on something → теплъэхьын : to search on something
 джыхэхъонэн – to curse someone directly → джыхэхъонэхьын – to curse someone nonstop

{|
|-
| ахэр || лӏым || пыохьыгъэх|-
| ахэр || лӏы-м || пыохьы-гъэ-х|-
| ||  || 
|-
| they (abs.) || man (erg.) ||they beat him up 
|- 
|colspan=2|"they beat the man up"
|}

{|
|-
| къэрэгъулхэр || уиджанэ || пыплъэхьыщтых|-
| къэрэгъул-хэ-р || уи-джанэ || пыплъэхьы-щт-ых|-
| ||  || 
|-
| the guards (abs.) || your shirt ||they gonna search on it 
|- 
|colspan=3|"the guards gonna search on your shirt"
|}

Manner (~кӏэ)
To indicate the manner a verb is done, the verbal suffix ~кӏэ (t͡ʃʼa) is added. In the Shapsug dialect the suffix ~кӏьэ (~kʲʼa) is used instead.

кӏо /kʷa/ – go → кӏуакӏэ /kʷʼaːt͡ʃʼa/ – manner of going; how to walk.
лажь /ɮaːʑ/ – work → лэжьакӏэ /ɮaʑaːt͡ʃʼa/ – manner of working; how to walk.
пкӏэ /pt͡ʃʼa/ – jump → пкӏакӏэ /pt͡ʃʼaːt͡ʃʼa/ – manner of jumping; how to jump.
тхэ /txa/ – write → тхакӏэ /txaːt͡ʃʼa/ – manner of writing; how to write.
дзы /d͡zə/ – throw → дзыкӏэ /d͡zət͡ʃʼa/ – manner of throwing; how to throw.
зао /zaːwa/ – war; fight → зэуакӏэ /zawaːt͡ʃʼa/ – manner of fighting; how to fight.

{|
|-
| кӏалэм || тэрэзэу ||тхакӏэ || къырагъэшӏагъ
|-
| кӏалэ-м || тэрэзэу ||тха-кӏэ || къы-р-а-гъэ-шӏа-гъ
|-
| ||  ||  || 
|-
| boy (erg.) || correctly || manner of writing || they taught him
|-
|colspan=3|"They taught the boy how to write correctly."
|}

{|
|-
| кӏалэм || зэуакӏэ || ешӏэ || дэгъоу
|-
| кӏалэ-м || зэу-акӏэ || ешӏэ || дэгъу-эу
|-
| ||  ||  || 
|-
| boy (erg.) || manner of fighting || (s)he knows || good
|-
|colspan=4|"The boy knows how to fight well."
|}

{|
|-
| мыжъо || псынкӏэу || дзыкӏэ || озгъэлъэгъущт
|-
| мащинэ || псынкӏэу ||фы-кӏэ || о-з-гъэ-лъэгъу-щт
|-
| ||  ||   || 
|-
| car ||quickly || manner of throwing || I will show you
|-
|colspan=3|"I will show you how to throw a rock quickly."
|}

It is also possible to indicate the manner in which someone does a verb. for example:

кӏо /kʷa/ – go → икӏуакӏэ /jəkʷʼaːt͡ʃʼa/ – his manner of walking.
лажь /ɮaːʑ/ – work → илэжьакӏэ /jəɮaʑaːt͡ʃʼa/ – his manner of working.
пкӏэ /pt͡ʃʼa/ – jump → ипкӏакӏэ /jəpt͡ʃʼaːt͡ʃʼa/ – his manner of jumping.
тхэ /txa/ – write → итхакӏэ /jətxaːt͡ʃʼa/ – his manner of writing
дзы /d͡zə/ – throw → идзыкӏэ /jaːd͡zət͡ʃʼa/ – his manner of throwing.

{|
|-
| о || уиеджакӏэ || дэгъоп
|-
| о || уи-еджа-кӏэ || дэгъо-п
|-
| ||  || 
|-
| you ||your way of studying || not good
|-
|colspan=3|"Your way of studying is not good."
|}

{|
|-
| лӏыжъым || икӏуакӏэ || лъэщы
|-
| лӏыжъы-м || и-кӏу-акӏэ || лъэщы
|-
| ||  || 
|-
| old man (erg.) ||his way of going || lame
|-
|colspan=3|"The way the old man goes is lame."
|}

Difficult (~гъуай)
To indicate that a verb is Difficult to do, the suffix -гъуай (-ʁʷaːj) is added

тхы /txə/ – write → тхыгъуай /txəʁʷaːj/ – difficult to spell; difficult to write
сэтхы /satxə/ – I write → сытхыгъуай /sətxəʁʷaːj/ – it is difficult for me to write
шӏэ /ʃʼa/ – do → шӏэгъуй /ʃʼaʁʷaːj/ – difficult to do
шхы /ʃxə/ – eat → шхыгъуй /ʃxəʁʷaːj/ – difficult to eat

{|
|бзылъфыгъэхэр || ащ || есэгъуаех|-
|бзылъфыгъэ-хэ-р || ащ || е-сэ-гъуаех|-
| ||  || 
|-
| women (abs.) || that || it is difficult to get used to|-
|colspan=3|"It is difficult for women to used to that."
|}

{|
| гъогу лъагъор || хэлъэгъогъуаеу || щытыгъ
|-
| гъогу лъагъо-р || хэ-лъэгъо-гъуаеу || щыт-ыгъ
|-
| ||  || 
|-
| road path (abs.) || being difficult to see || it was
|-
|colspan=3|"The path was difficult to see."
|}

Easy (~гъошӏу)
To indicate that a verb is easy to do, the suffix -гъошӏу (-ʁʷaʃʷʼ) is added

тхы /txə/ – write → тхыгъошӏу /txəʁʷaʃʷʼ/ – easy to spell; easy to write
сэтхы /satxə/ – I write → сытхыгъошӏу /sətxəʁʷaʃʷʼ/ – it is easy for me to write; I write easily
шӏэ /ʃʼa/ – do → шӏэгъошӏу /ʃʼaʁʷaʃʷʼ/ – easy to do
шхы /ʃxə/ – eat → шхыгъошӏу /ʃxəʁʷaʃʷʼ/ – easy to eat

{|
| джанэр || дыгъош1у|-
| джанэ-р || ды-гъош1у|-
| || 
|-
| dress (abs.) || easy to sewn|-
|colspan=3|"The dress is sewn easily."
|}

{|
| гъогу лъагъор || хэлъэгъогъуаеу || щытыгъ
|-
| гъогу лъагъо-р || хэ-лъэгъо-гъуаеу || щыт-ыгъ
|-
| ||  || 
|-
| road path (abs.) || being difficult to see || it was
|-
|colspan=3|"The path was difficult to see."
|}

Warning mood (~къон)
To either warn or intimidate the listener(s) from doing a certain verb, the verbal suffix ~къон (~qʷan) is added to it.

уеплъы /wajpɬə/ – you are looking at → уеплъыкъон /wajpɬəqʷan/ – don't you dare to look at.
макӏо /maːkʷʼa/ – (s)he is going → мэкӏокъон /makʷʼaqʷan/ – don't (s)he dare to go
шъошхы /ʃʷaʃxə/ – you (plural) are eating it → шъушхыкъон /ʃʷəʃxəqʷan/ – don't you (plural) dare to eat it
мачъэх /maːt͡ʂax/ – they are running → мэчъэкъоных /mat͡ʂaqʷanəx/ – don't they dare to run.

{|
|-
|Унашъхьэм || укъепкӏэкъон|-
|Унашъхьэ-м || у-къ-епкӏэ-къон|-
| ||
|-
| root (erg.) || don't dare to jump from|-
|colspan=2|"Don't dare to jump from the roof."
|}

{|
|-
|Кӏалэм || епӏотэкъон || пысӏохьхэрэр
|-
|Кӏалэ-м || е-п-ӏотэ-къон || пы-с-ӏохь-хэ-рэ-р
|-
| || || 
|-
| boy (erg.) || don't dare to tell him || the things I am saying about him
|-
|colspan=3|"Don't dare to tell the boy the things I am saying about him."
|}

{|
|-
|Кӏалэхэр || Фылымым || азакъоу ||ерэплъыкъоных|-
|Кӏалэ-хэ-р || Фылым-ым || а-закъо-у ||е-рэ-плъы-къон-ых|-
| || || || 
|-
| the boys (abs.) || film (erg.) || while they being alone || don't they dare to look at 
|-
|colspan=4|"Don't the boys dare to look at the film."
|}

Directed towards (~лӏ)
The verbal suffix ~лӏ (~lʼ) designates action directed towards, or applied to somebody or something. For example: 
ечъэлӏэн: to come running up to somebody or something.
ехьэлӏэн: to take, carry or bring something/somebody to somebody else.
екӏолӏэн: to approach something or somebody.
ехъолӏэн: an event to come and happen to someone.
еӏолӏэн: to say something about a statement.

{|
|-
|кӏалэм || дэгъухэ || къехъолӏагъэх|-
|кӏалэ-м || дэгъу-хэ || къ-е-хъо-лӏ-агъ-эх|-
| ||  || 
|-
| the boy (erg.) || good things || they happened to him/her|-
|colspan=3|"Good things happened to the boy."
|}

{|
|-
|сыд || унэм|| ишъо || епӏуалӏэрэ?
|-
|сыд || унэ-м|| и-шъо || е-п-ӏу-алӏэ-рэ?
|-
| ||  ||  || 
|-
| what || house (erg.) || its color || the thing you say about it|-
|colspan=4|"What do you say about the house's color?"
|}

{|
|-
|кӏалэр || гъогум || екӏуалӏэ|-
|кӏалэ-р || гъогу-м || екӏу-алӏэ|-
| ||  || 
|-
| boy (abs.) || road (erg.) || (s)he is approaching it|-
|colspan=3|"The boy is approaching the road."
|}

Slightly (~ӏо)
The verbal suffix ~ӏо designates slightness; for example:
 кӏотаӏо : move a little further.
 кӏотыӏуагъэ : He moved on.
 кӏотыгъаӏо : He went further.
 ӏэтыӏо : lift slightly higher.

Mistakenly (~хъу)
The verbal suffix ~хъу designates mistakenness; for example:
 ӏохъу : speak irrelevantly.
 ӏохъугъэ : He said irrelevantly.

Willingly (~п)
The verbal suffix ~п designates action done willingly; for example:
 сыкӏопэн : I will go willingly.
 сымыкӏопэн : I will not go willingly.

Preliminary condition (~хэ)
The verbal suffix ~хэ designates preliminary condition; for example :
 зытхьэкIыхэн: wash yourself first.
 зытхьэкIыхи шхэ: first wash yourself, and then eat.

Absolute (~х)
The verbal suffix ~хэ designates absolute; for example:
 сыкӏохэн : I will definitely go.
 сымыкӏохэн : I will definitely not go.

Pre (~пэу)
Together with the negative ~м~ infix, The verbal suffix ~п designates before; earlier in time. for example :
 макӏо: (s)he goes → мамыкӏуапэу: before (s)he goes
 нэсы: (s)he reaches → нэмысыпэу: before (s)he reaches
 машхэ: (s)he eats → мэмышхапэу: before (s)he start eating
 машхагъ: (s)he eats → мэмышхэгъапэу: before (s)he ends eating

Post (~уж)
The verbal suffix ~уж designates after; later in time. for example :
 макӏо: (s)he goes → мэкӏоужым : after (s)he went
 нэсы: (s)he reaches → нэмысыужым: after (s)he reaches
 машхэ: (s)he eats → мэшхыужым: after (s)he eats

References

 1 Kabardian Verbal Affixes: Collected, arranged and edited by Amjad Jaimoukha : .
 2 Адыгейский язык: Grammar :  (in Russian')

Northwest Caucasian grammars
Adyghe language